= Grand Canal of Versailles =

Basin in the park of the Château de Versailles

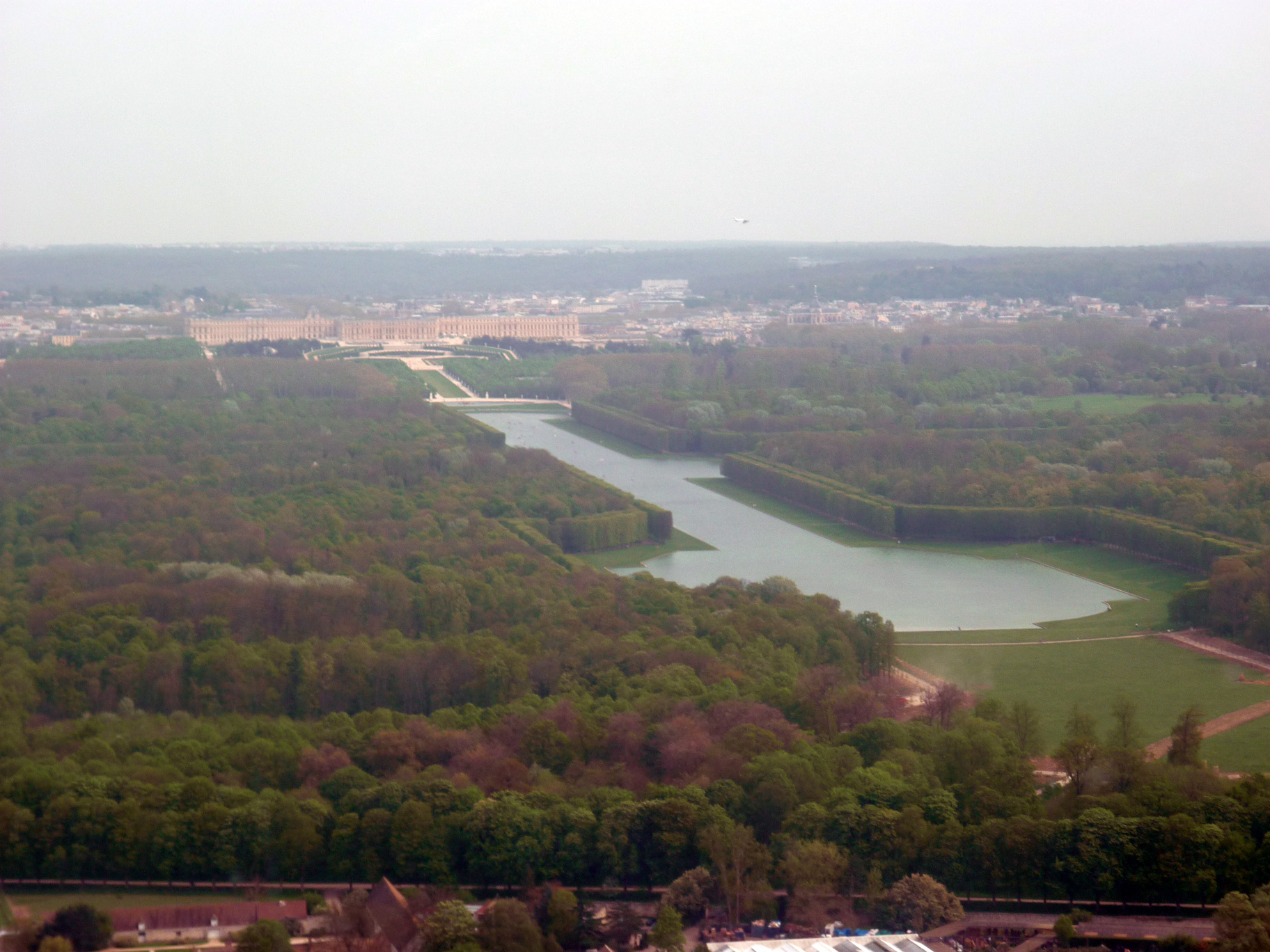
- Aerial view of the Grand Canal from the west, with the château de Versailles in the background.

- Location within France
- Location: Versailles
- Coordinates: 48°48′36″N 2°06′00″E
- Type: Artificial pond
- Primary inflows: Gally river and fountains from the Palace of Versailles
- Primary outflows: Gally river
- Max. length: 1.8 km (1.1 mi)
- Max. width: 62 m (203 ft)
- Average depth: 2 m (6 ft 7 in)
- Surface elevation: 108 m (354 ft)

The Grand Canal of Versailles is the largest basin in the park of the Palace of Versailles. Cross-shaped, it was built between 1667 and 1679, at the instigation of André Le Nôtre. Prior to this date, the park was closed by a gate and ended behind the Bassin des Cygnes.

== Presentation ==
At first, the French Academy of Sciences dissuaded the "King's gardener" from embarking on such an undertaking, as the terrain - a marshy area known as "étang puant" (stinking pond), which was the source of many illnesses among Versaillais - was very uneven at the time. Nonetheless, this monumental water feature was successfully completed, cutting through the Ru de Gally river, which was used to feed the canal.

Today, the layout of the Grand Canal takes the form of a cross, the main east-west perspective of which is located in the axis of the château and measures 1.670 kilometres (1.038 mi). The perpendicular branch (which was dug first), running north-south and 1.5 km (0.93 mi) long, is made up of two branches: the northern branch, running towards Trianon, is 400 metres (1,300 ft) long, while the southern branch, running towards the Royal Menagerie (no longer in existence), is 600 m (2,000 ft) long.

These two axes, north-south and east-west, are both 62 m (203 ft) wide and cover a surface area of 24 hectares (59 acres), for a perimeter of 5.5 km (3.4 mi), initially lined with four rows of elm trees, and embellished with statues by Jean-Baptiste Tuby, based on sketches by Charles Le Brun, depicting children and hippocampus.

When the work was completed in 1679, the Grand Canal served as the starting point for fireworks during the sumptuous royal festivities that Louis XIV organized at Versailles.

It is a common perception that every year, on 5 September, the anniversary of Louis XIV's birth (in 1638), the sun sets in line with the Grand Canal; other sources mention 25 August, Saint Louis Day. In reality, neither of these two statements is correct: it is on 16 August (and 26 April in spring) that such a sunset can be observed. The history of the construction of the park at Versailles suggests that the orientation of the canal was simply determined by the topography of the site.

In winter, when frost prohibited all navigation, the Grand Canal was transformed into a skating rink for skaters and sleighs.

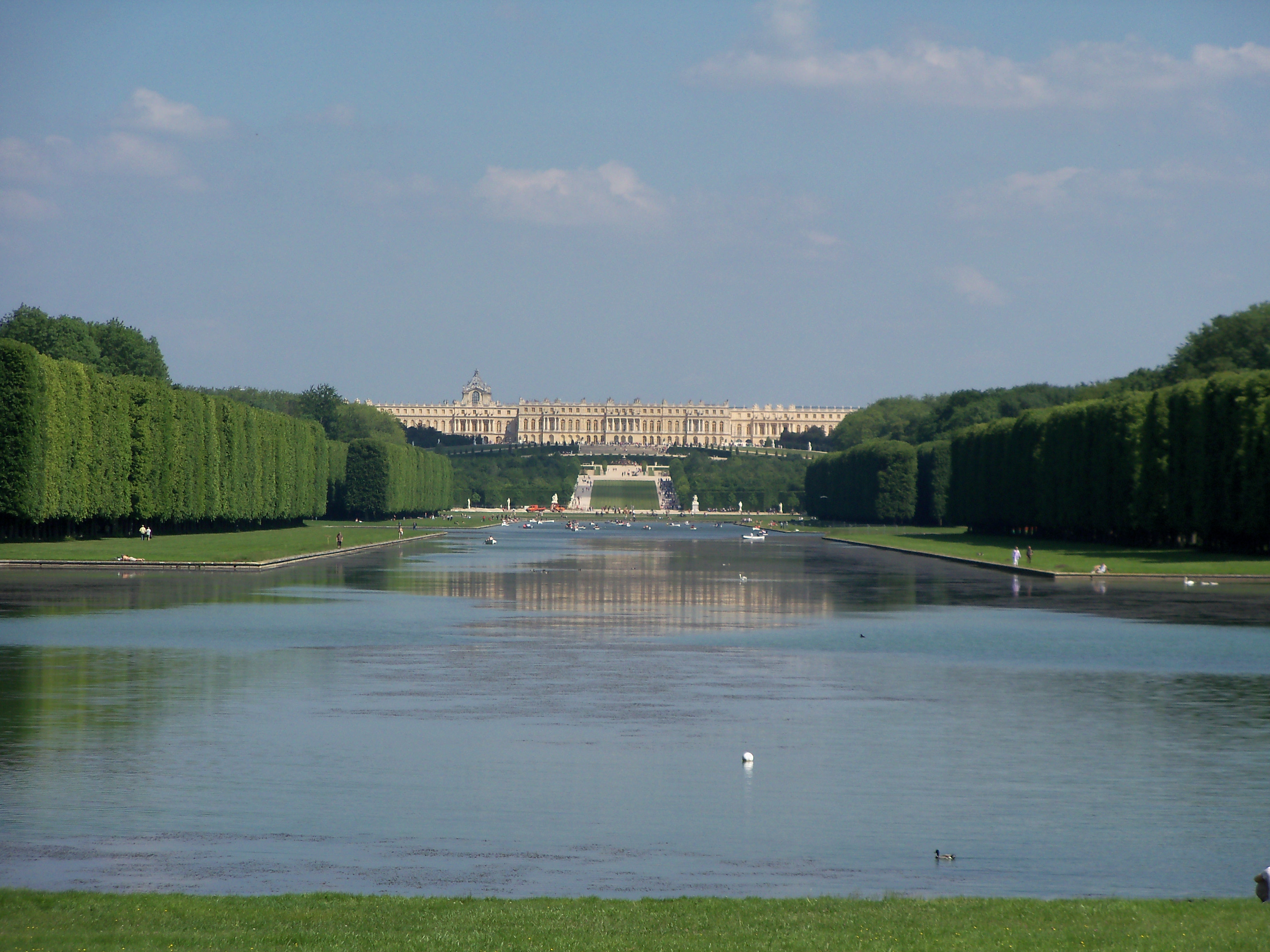
Grand Canal seen from the west.

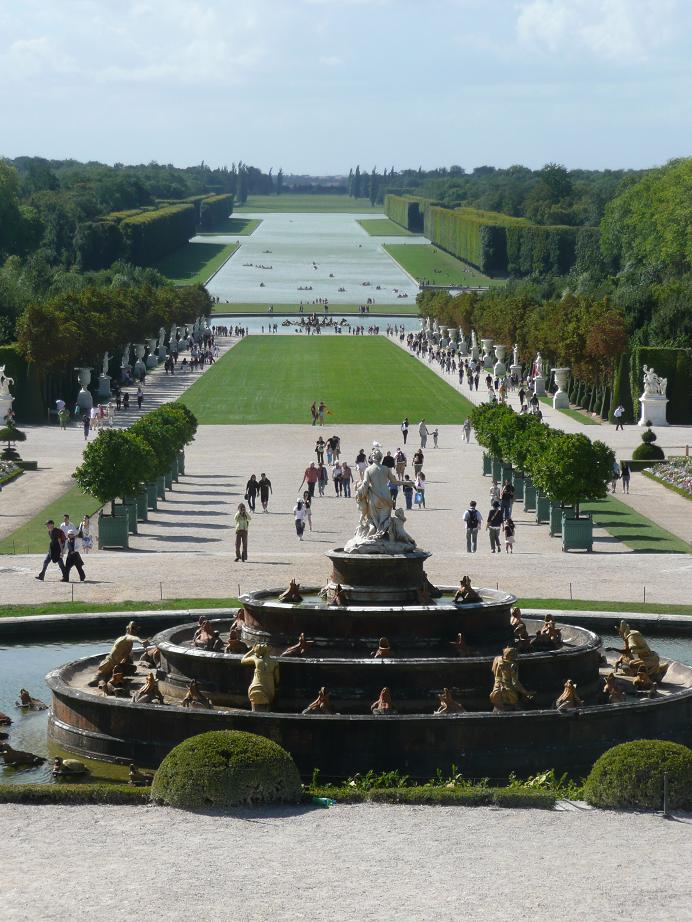
The Grand Canal as seen from the Gardens of Versailles.

Over and above the decorative and playful requirements of this aspect of the garden, the Grand Canal also played a practical role. Located at a low point in the park, it received water from the fountains in the upstream gardens. This water was then pumped by a network of pumps driven by windmills and horse mills, and returned to the reservoir on the roof of the Thétys grotto to replenish the fountains. This hydraulic system operated in a closed circuit.

During the French Revolution, the canal was filled in and used as a wheat field. Louis XVIII restored it to its original purpose.

In 2016, Danish artist Olafur Eliasson installed Waterfall at the eastern end of the Grand Canal.

== Marine ==
=== Fleet ===
Louis XIV sailed a substantial fleet: a three-masted ship (Le Grand Vaisseau), a galley, rowboats, galiots, brigantines, gondolas (donated by the Doge of Venice) and, from 1675, two yachts from England.

The replica of the Grand Vaisseau is currently under construction by the non-profit organization Atelier Marin in Brussels.

=== Marines ===
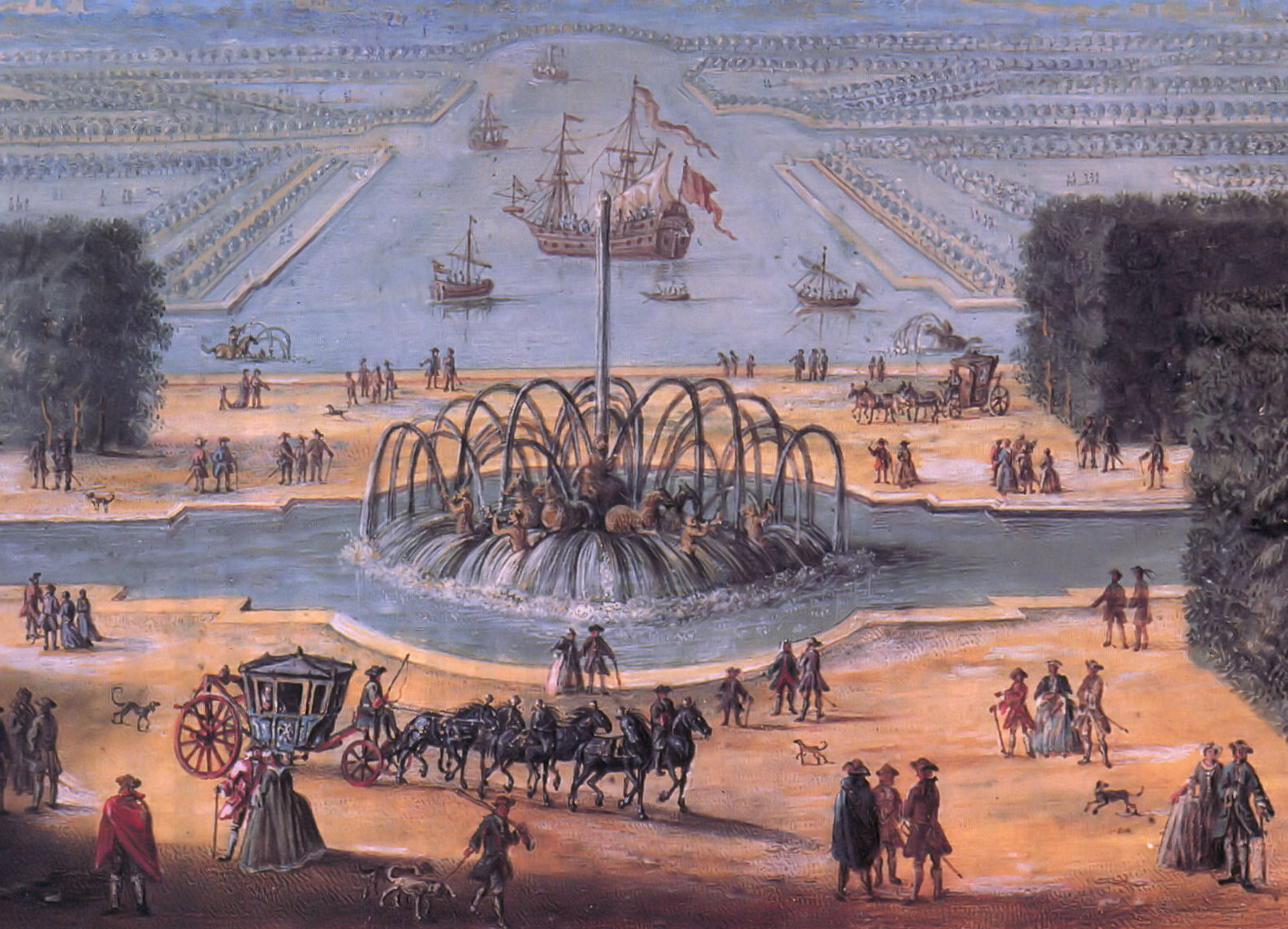
The Bassin d'Apollon, with the fleet on the Grand Canal in the background.

Until the 17th century, sailors from Le Pecq, Poissy and Saint-Cloud would have been housed at the south end of the "allée des Matelots" (sailors' street), in an area that has since become a railway station with the "Gare des Matelots" (sailors' station) (serving the nearby "Camp des Matelots" (sailors' camp). These were replaced in 1684 by a fixed crew comprising: a lieutenant, a master, a foreman, eleven seamen, six gondoliers (including two Toulon and four Venetian sailors), eight carpenters (including two Italians), two caulkers and a pit sawyer, all under the command of Captain Consolin. They were housed in purpose-built buildings known as "Little Venice" at the eastern end of the Grand Canal, in the immediate vicinity of the "Bassin d'Apollon" (Apollo's basin).

In 1685, 260 men from Flanders were assigned to three companies for the frigates.
