= Apollo basin =

The Apollo Basin may refer to:

- The Bassin d'Apollon, a fountain in the gardens of the Chateau of Versailles
- Apollo (crater), a large impact crater on the Moon
