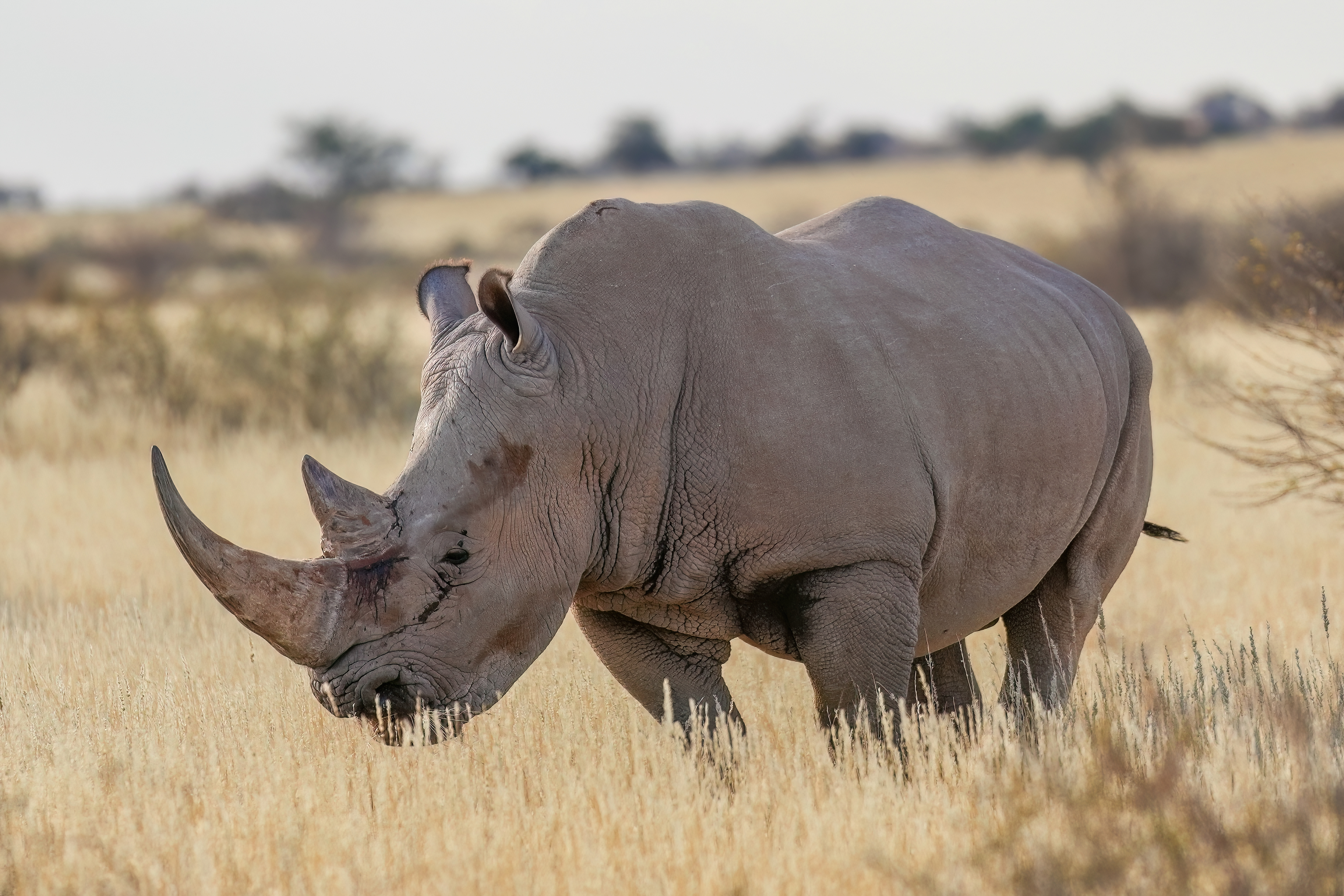
- White rhinoceros (Ceratotherium simum)

Scientific classification
- Kingdom: Animalia
- Phylum: Chordata
- Class: Mammalia
- Order: Perissodactyla
- Superfamily: Rhinocerotoidea
- Family: Rhinocerotidae; Gray, 1821

Type genus
- Rhinoceros Linnaeus, 1758

Subfamilies, extant and subfossil genera
- †Aceratheriinae; †Elasmotheriinae; †Elasmotherium; Rhinocerotinae; Ceratotherium; Dicerorhinus; Diceros; Rhinoceros; †Coelodonta; †Stephanorhinus; Fossil genera, see text
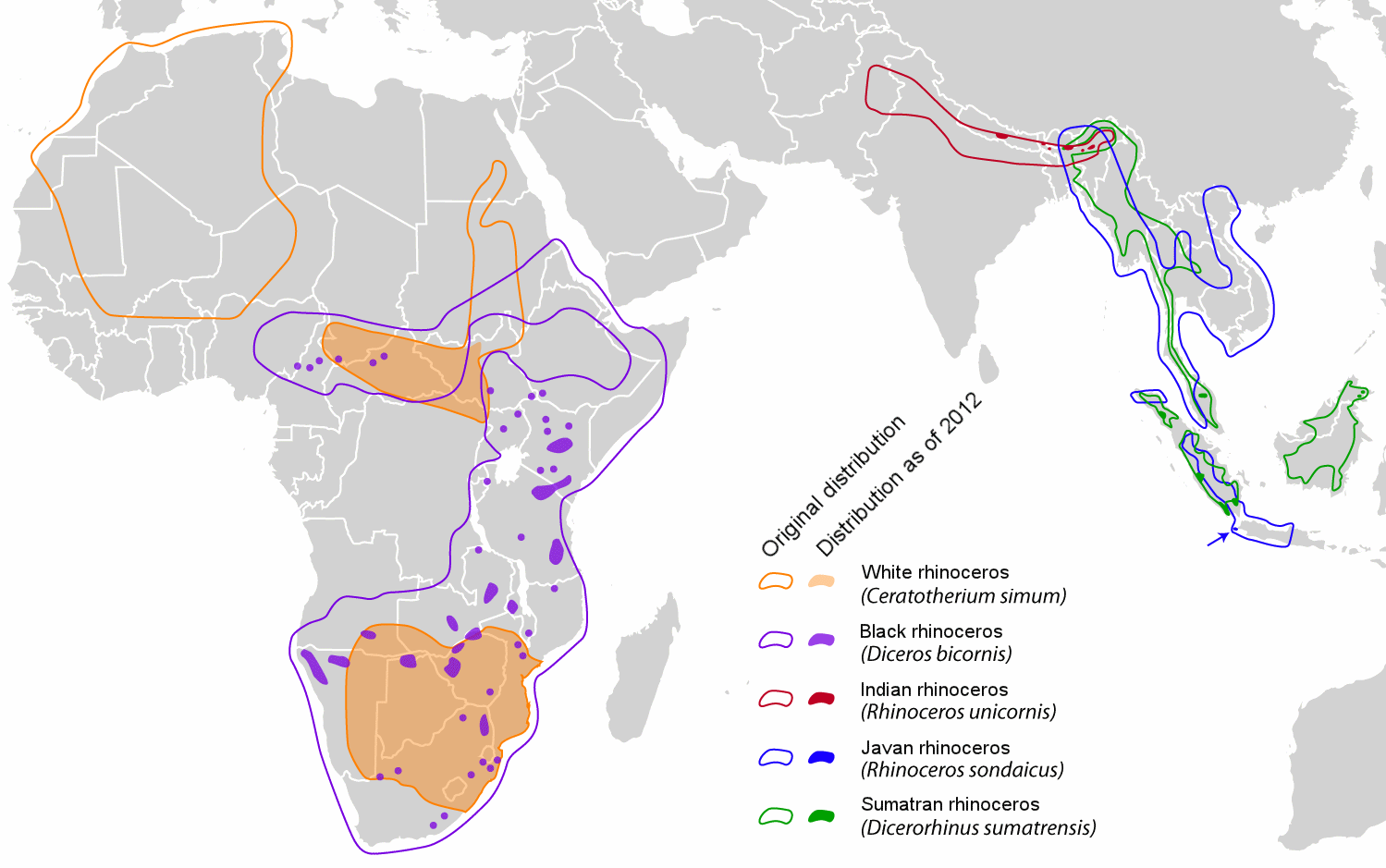
- Rhinoceros range

= Rhinoceros =

Rhinoceros Temporal range: Eocene–Present

Family of mammals

A rhinoceros (/raɪˈnɒsərəs/ ry-NOSS-ə-rəss; from Ancient Greek ῥινόκερως (rhinókerōs) 'nose-horned'; from ῥίς (rhis) 'nose' and κέρας (kéras) 'horn'; pl.: rhinoceros or rhinoceroses), commonly abbreviated to rhino, is a member of any of the five extant species (or numerous extinct species) of odd-toed ungulates (perissodactyls) in the family Rhinocerotidae. It is the only living family in the superfamily Rhinocerotoidea (whose members are also sometimes called rhinoceroses; the term true rhinoceroses is sometimes used for Rhinocerotidae). Two of the extant species, the black rhinoceros (Diceros bicornis) and the white rhinoceros (Ceratotherium simum) are native to Africa, while the other three, the Javan rhinoceros (Rhinoceros sondaicus), Indian rhinoceros (Rhinoceros unicornis) and Sumatran rhinoceros (Dicerorhinus sumatrensis) are native to South and Southeast Asia.

Rhinoceroses are some of the largest remaining megafauna: all weigh over half a tonne in adulthood. They have one or two horns, a thick 1.5–5 cm (0.59–1.97 in), protective skin formed from layers of collagen positioned in a lattice structure, and relatively small brains 400–600 g (14–21 oz) for mammals of their size. They have a herbivorous diet, generally eating leafy material, although their ability to ferment food in their hindgut allows them to subsist on more fibrous plant matter when necessary. Unlike other perissodactyls, the two African species of rhinoceros lack teeth at the front of their mouths; they rely instead on their lips to pluck food.

Rhinoceroses are killed by poachers for their horns, which are bought and sold on the black market for high prices, leading to most living rhinoceros species being considered endangered. The contemporary market for rhino horn is overwhelmingly driven by China and Vietnam, where it is bought by wealthy consumers to use in traditional Chinese medicine, among other uses. Rhino horns are made of keratin, the same material as hair and fingernails, and there is no good evidence of any health benefits. A market also exists for rhino horn dagger handles in Yemen, which was the major source of demand for rhino horn in the 1970s and 1980s.

== Taxonomy and naming ==
- Rhinocerotidae
  - - Ceratotherium simum
    - Diceros bicornis
  - - Dicerorhinus sumatrensis
    - - Rhinoceros sondaicus
      - Rhinoceros unicornis

Cladogram following a phylogenetic study

The word rhinoceros is derived through Latin from the Ancient Greek: ῥινόκερως, which is composed of ῥινο- (rhino-, "of the nose") and κέρας (keras, "horn") with a horn on the nose. The name has been in use since the 14th century. Rhinoceros can either be referred to in plural as rhinoceros or as rhinoceroses. The first species of rhinoceros to be scientifically named were the Indian rhinoceros and black rhinoceros by Carl Linnaeus in his 10th edition of Systema Naturae in 1758. He also coined the genus Rhinoceros, which was originally used for all rhinoceroses. In his original classification scheme, Linnaeus placed the genus Rhinoceros within the group Glires, erroneously considering them closely related to rodents, because Indian rhinoceroses had incisor teeth. Initially in the 18th and the early 19th century there was confusion about the true number of living rhinoceros species. The family Rhinocerotidae was first named in 1821 as Rhynocerotidæ by John Edward Gray in his paper "On the natural arrangement of vertebrose animals". Some authors alternatively credit Richard Owen's 1845 work "Odontography" as the authority of Rhinocerotidae, which uses the modern spelling of the family.

== Description ==
Rhinoceroses are among the largest living land animals, with living species ranging in average weight from 775 kilograms (1,709 lb) in the Sumatran rhinoceros, to 2,300 kilograms (5,100 lb) in the white rhinoceros. Some extinct rhinocerotids were considerably smaller and larger than living rhinoceroses, with the genus Menoceras from the Early Miocene of North America having an estimated body mass of 313 kilograms (690 lb), comparable to a large pig, while Elasmotherium sibiricum from the Pleistocene of Eurasia has an estimated body mass of approximately 4,500 kilograms (9,900 lb), comparable to an elephant. The skulls of rhinoceroses are generally saddle-shaped and low, with rhinoceroses being primitively characterised by the presence of a chisel-shaped upper first incisor (I1) and a tusk-like lower second incisor (i2), with all other incisors and the canines typically being lost. Black and white rhinoceroses completely lack incisors. Living rhinoceroses have either one or two horns, which are formed from columns of densely packed corneocytes originating from dermal papillae. The development and growth of rhinoceros horns is similar to that of human nails, with both being largely made of keratin. The horns are attached to a rugose (roughly textured) area on the surface of the skull. Horns are not a universal feature of rhinocerotids, with horns thought to be absent in many extinct rhinocerotids (such as most members of the subfamily Aceratheriinae). True horns may have only been present in Rhinocerotinae, due to non-rhinocerotine rhinocerotids lacking the ring-shaped rugose bone marks found on modern rhinoceros skulls where the horns attach.

The brains of rhinoceroses are relatively small compared to body size, around 531 grams (18.7 oz) in an adult black rhinoceros. The limb bones tend to be robust (proportionally thick and stocky). All living and the vast majority of extinct rhinoceroses have three toes on each foot. The body is covered in an armour of thick skin made of a dense crosslinked network of collagen fibres that is stronger and stiffer than those of other mammals. The skin exhibits prominent folding. The skin in living species is grey to brown in colour, and typically sparsely covered in hair or hairless as adults, with the exception of the eyelashes, ears, and the tail-brush. The exception is the Sumatran rhinoceros, which is often covered with a considerable amount of hair.

While the black rhinoceros has 84 chromosomes (diploid number, 2N, per cell), all other rhinoceros species have 82 chromosomes. Chromosomal polymorphism might lead to varying chromosome counts. For instance, in a study there were three northern white rhinoceroses with 81 chromosomes.

== Behaviour and ecology ==
White rhinoceros female and juvenile

Living rhinoceroses' gregariousness varies between species. Adult males tend to be solitary. This is also true of female Asian rhinoceroses, though the females of African species sometimes form groups, with these groups being more common in white than black rhinoceroses. Rhinoceroses have widely varying diets ranging from strict grazing (such as the white rhinoceros) to largely browsing (such as the black rhinoceros) to a mixture between both (the Sumatran and Javan rhinoceros). As bulk feeders of low quality vegetation, rhinoceroses spend a majority of their time foraging. Rhinoceroses are hindgut fermenters.

All living rhinoceroses have a polyandrous and polygynous mating system where both males and females seek to mate with multiple individuals of the opposite sex. Male rhinoceroses guard reproductive age females until they are in full estrous though the females sometimes may drive away males until they are receptive. Male rhinoceroses taste the urine of female rhinoceroses and perform a flehmen response with the upper lip to determine their reproductive status. Adult males in the vicinity of oestrous females may become aggressive towards other males. These confrontations can range from ritualized behaviour to serious fighting that can result in significant injuries. In some species, male rhinoceroses are territorial, while in other species they are not or are only territorial depending on local environmental conditions. Females will sometimes reject males they consider undesirable, which results in them fleeing or fighting the male if cornered. During copulation, the male slides his neck up the back of the female, before using his neck as a lever to get his forelegs off the ground, before moving the front legs behind the shoulders of the female. Copulation can last several hours. Pregnancy lasts for over a year, around 460 days in the black rhinoceros and 504 days in the white rhinoceros.

The female generally gives birth in a secluded area and becomes aggressive towards other rhinoceroses for a while after giving birth. Calves typically stand up within 30 minutes of birth and begin to suck on their mother's teats within two hours of birth. The mother generally has a strong bond with her most recently born calf. The calf generally remains close to its mother the majority of the time, although at least in some species they are sometimes left considerable distances away. Up until they are around three years old, juvenile rhinoceroses are vulnerable to predation. Mothers are vigorously protective of their calves against potential predators. Juvenile one-horned rhinoceroses are rejected by their mothers around the time of the birth of her next calf. There is generally a gap of several years between females giving birth again after having her previous calf, though the gap can be as short as a year and a half. Rhinoceroses become sexually mature at around five to eight years of age, generally around a year later in males than in females in black and Sumatran rhinoceroses, though male white rhinoceroses become socio-sexually mature at around 12 years of age, four years after females start giving birth.

== Extant species ==
The five extant species

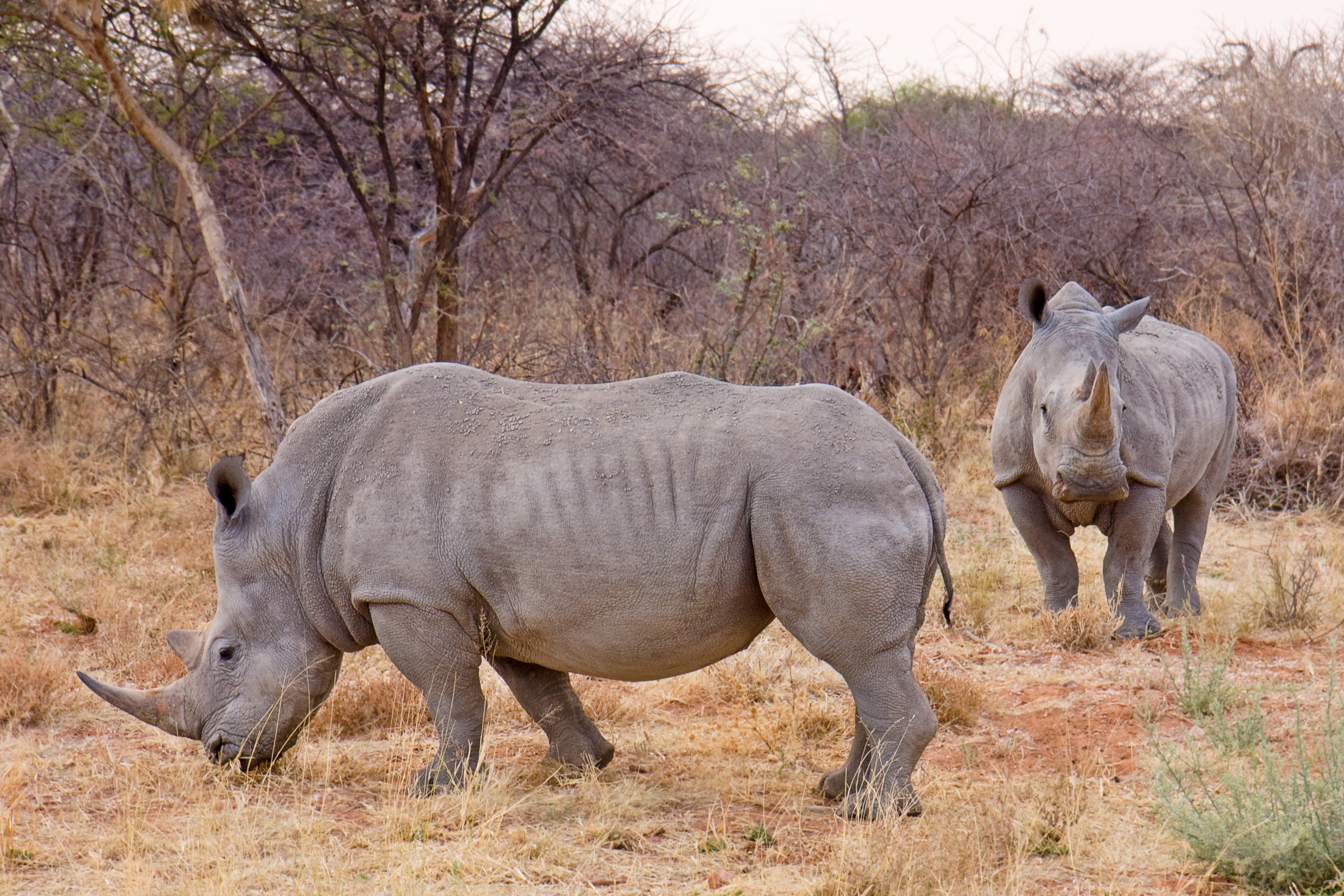
The white rhinoceros is actually grey.

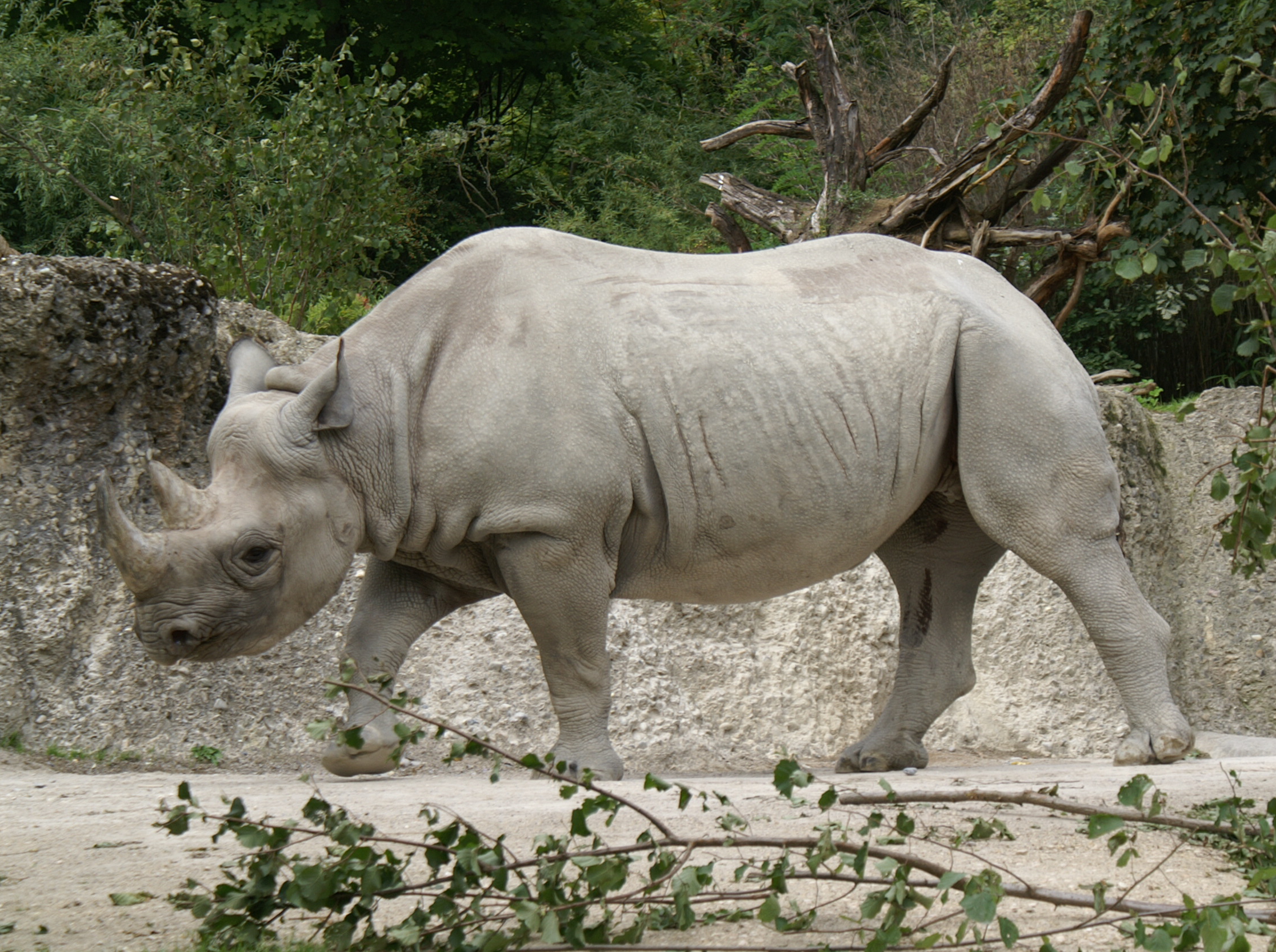
The black rhinoceros has a beak shaped lip and is similar in color to the white rhinoceros.

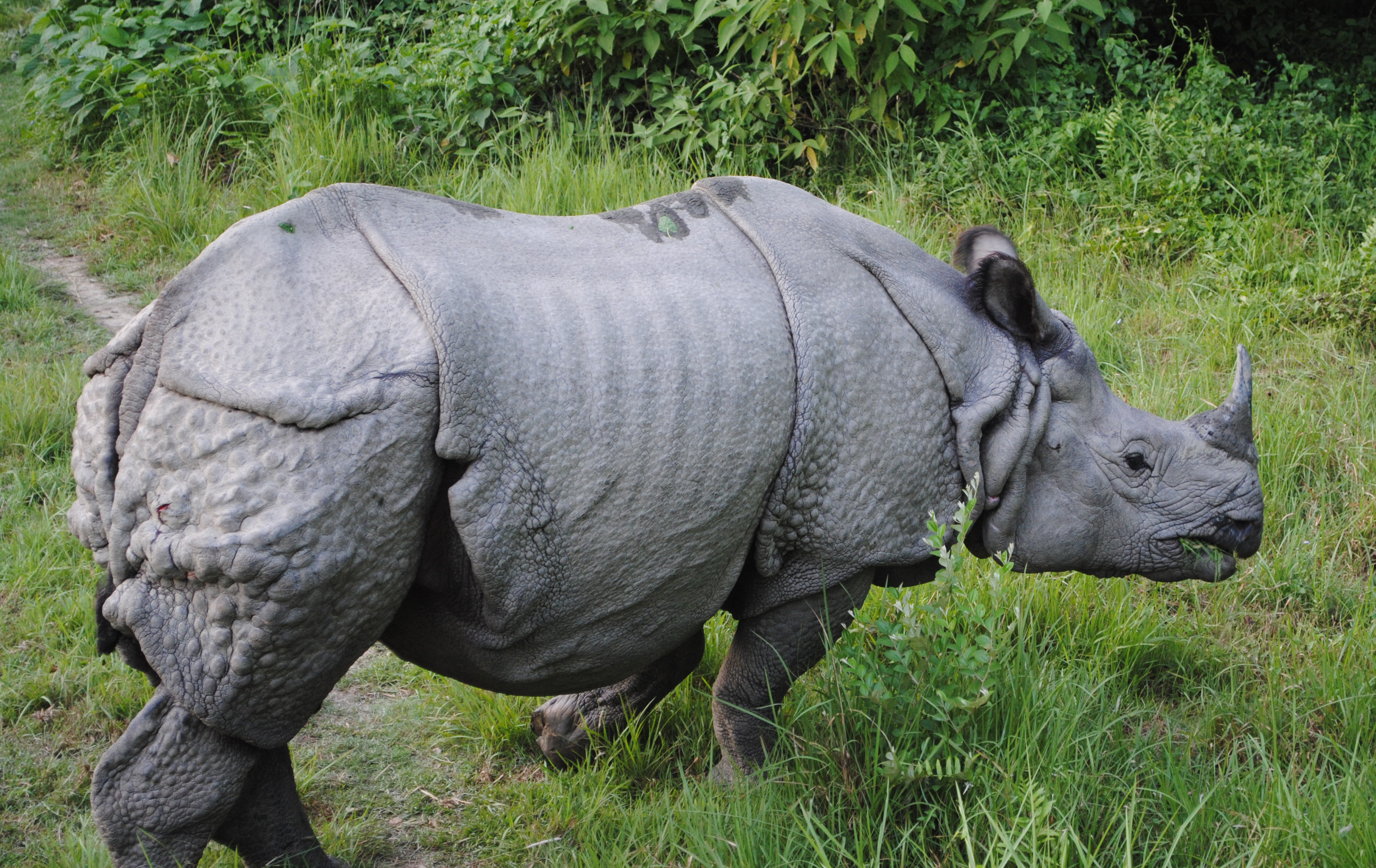
The Indian rhinoceros has a single horn.

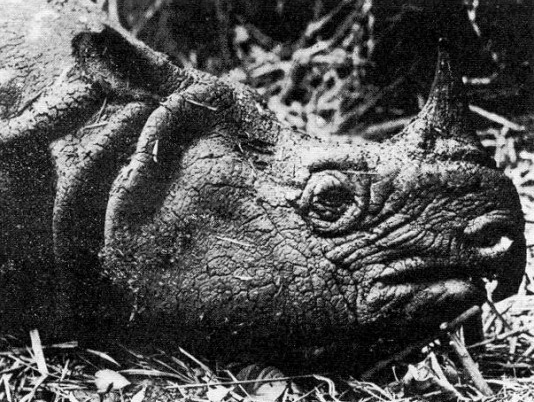
Smaller in size than the Indian rhinoceros, the Javan rhinoceros also has a single horn.

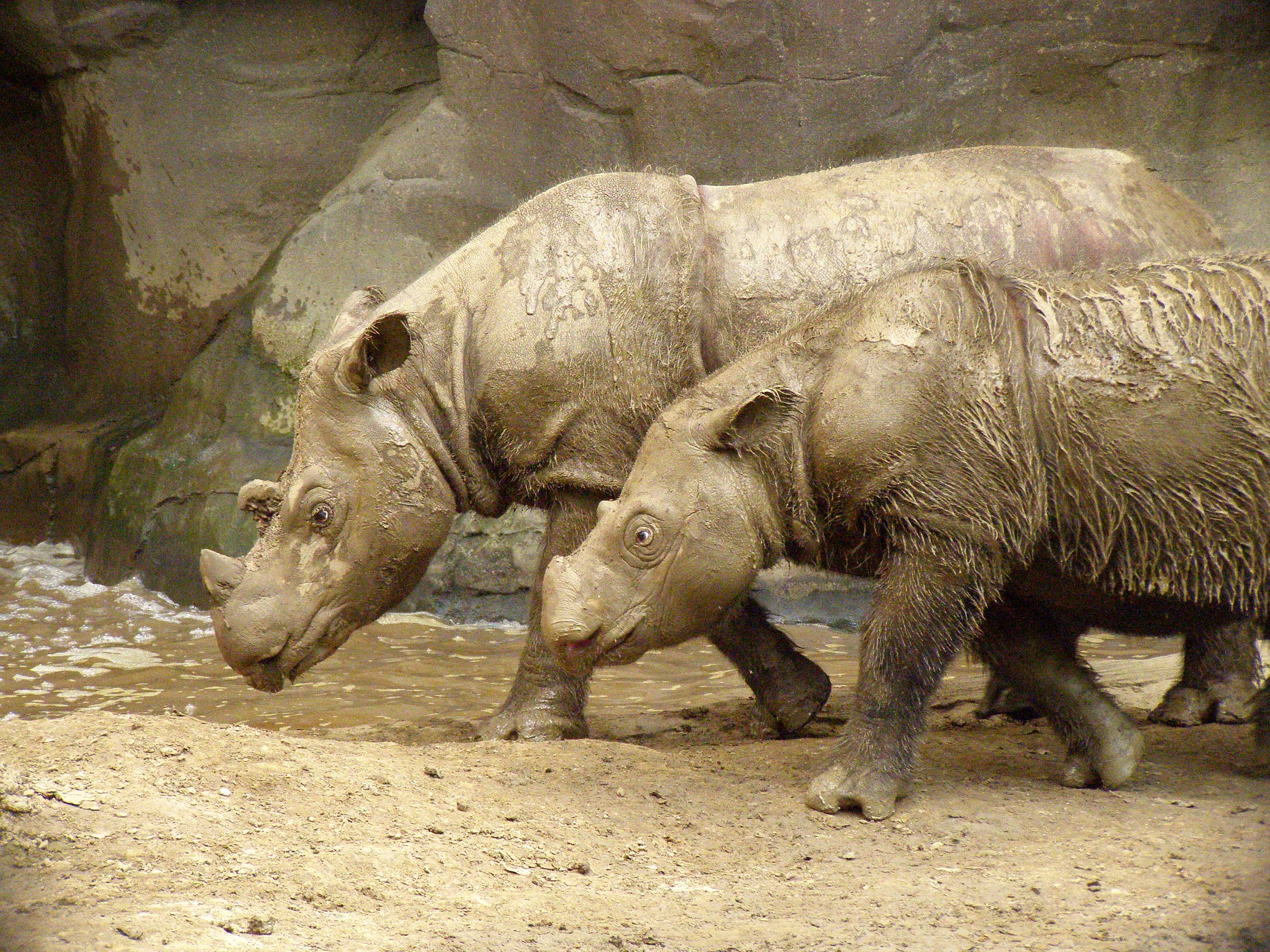
The Sumatran rhinoceros is the smallest of the rhino species.

=== White ===
There are two subspecies of white rhinoceros: the southern white rhinoceros (Ceratotherium simum simum) and the northern white rhinoceros (Ceratotherium simum cottoni). As of 2013, the southern subspecies has a wild population of 20,405—making them the most abundant rhino subspecies in the world. The northern subspecies is critically endangered, with all that is known to remain being two captive females. There is no conclusive explanation of the name "white rhinoceros". A popular idea that "white" is a distortion of either the Afrikaans word wyd or the Dutch word wijd (or its other possible spellings whyde, weit, etc.,), meaning "wide" and referring to the rhino's square lips, is not supported by linguistic studies.

The white rhino has an immense body and large head, a short neck and broad chest. Females weigh 1,600 kg (3,500 lb) and males 2,400 kg (5,300 lb) on average, though exceptional specimens can reportedly weigh up to 4,500 kg (9,900 lb). The head-and-body length is 3.5–4.6 m (11–15 ft) and the shoulder height is 1.8–2 m (5.9–6.6 ft). On its snout it has two horns. The front horn is larger than the other horn and averages 90 cm (35 in) in length and can reach 150 cm (59 in). The white rhinoceros also has a prominent muscular hump that supports its relatively large head. The colour of this animal can range from yellowish brown to slate grey. Most of its body hair is found on the ear fringes and tail bristles, with the rest distributed rather sparsely over the rest of the body. White rhinos have the distinctive flat broad mouth that is used for grazing.

A subspecific hybrid white rhino (Ceratotherium s. simum × C. s. cottoni) was bred at the Dvůr Králové Zoo (Zoological Garden Dvur Kralove nad Labem) in the Czech Republic in 1977. Interspecific hybridisation of black and white rhinoceroses has also been confirmed.

=== Black ===
The name "black rhinoceros" (Diceros bicornis) was chosen to distinguish this species from the white rhinoceros (Ceratotherium simum). This can be confusing, as the two species are not truly distinguishable by color. There are four subspecies of black rhino: South-central (Diceros bicornis minor), the most numerous, which once ranged from central Tanzania south through Zambia, Zimbabwe and Mozambique to northern and eastern South Africa; South-western (Diceros bicornis occidentalis) which are better adapted to the arid and semi-arid savannas of Namibia, southern Angola, western Botswana and western South Africa; East African (Diceros bicornis michaeli), primarily in Tanzania; and West African (Diceros bicornis longipes) which was declared extinct in November 2011. The native Tswanan name keitloa describes a South African variation of the black rhino in which the posterior horn is equal to or longer than the anterior horn.

An adult black rhinoceros stands 1.50–1.75 m (59–69 in) high at the shoulder and is 3.5–3.9 m (11–13 ft) in length. An adult weighs from 850 to 1,600 kg (1,870 to 3,530 lb), exceptionally to 1,800 kg (4,000 lb), with the females being smaller than the males. Two horns on the skull are made of keratin with the larger front horn typically 50 cm (20 in) long, exceptionally up to 140 cm (55 in). Sometimes, a third smaller horn may develop. The black rhino is much smaller than the white rhino, and has a pointed mouth, which it uses to grasp leaves and twigs when feeding.

During the latter half of the 20th century, their numbers were severely reduced from an estimated 70,000 in the late 1960s to a record low of 2,410 in 1995. Since then, numbers have been steadily increasing at a continental level with numbers doubling to 4,880 by the end of 2010. As of 2008, the numbers are still 90% lower than three generations ago.

=== Indian ===
The Indian rhinoceros, or greater one-horned rhinoceros, (Rhinoceros unicornis) has a single horn 20 to 60 cm long. It is nearly as large as the African white rhino. Its thick, silver-brown skin folds into the shoulder, back, and rump, giving it an armored appearance. Its upper legs and shoulders are covered in wart-like bumps, and it has very little body hair. Grown males are larger than females in the wild, weighing from 2,500–3,200 kg (5,500–7,100 lb). Shoulder height is 1.75–2.0 m (5.7–6.6 ft). Females weigh about 1,900 kg (4,200 lb) and are 3–4 m (9.8–13 ft) long. The record-sized specimen was approximately 4,000 kg (8,800 lb).

Indian rhinos once inhabited many areas ranging from Pakistan to Myanmar and maybe even parts of China. Because of humans, they now exist in only several protected areas of India (in Assam, West Bengal, and a few pairs in Uttar Pradesh) and Nepal, plus a pair in Lal Suhanra National Park in Pakistan reintroduced there from Nepal. They are confined to the tall grasslands and forests in the foothills of the Himalayas. Two-thirds of the world's Indian rhinoceroses are now confined to the Kaziranga National Park situated in the Golaghat district of Assam, India.

=== Javan ===
The Javan rhinoceros (Rhinoceros sondaicus) is one of the most endangered large mammals in the world. According to 2015 estimates, only about 60 remain, in Java, Indonesia, all in the wild. It is also the least known rhino species. Like the closely related, and larger, Indian rhinoceros, the Javan rhino has a single horn. Its hairless, hazy gray skin falls into folds into the shoulder, back, and rump, giving it an armored appearance. Its length reaches 3.1–3.2 m (10–10 ft) including the head, and its height 1.5–1.7 m (4 ft 11 in – 5 ft 7 in). Adults are variously reported to weigh 900–1,400 kg (2,000–3,100 lb) or 1,360–2,000 kg (3,000–4,410 lb). Male horns can reach 26 cm (10 in) in length, while in females they are knobs or altogether absent. These animals prefer dense lowland rain forest, tall grass and reed beds that are plentiful with large floodplains and mud wallows.

Though once widespread throughout Asia, by the 1930s, they were nearly hunted to extinction in Nepal, India, Burma, Peninsular Malaysia, and Sumatra for the supposed medical powers of their horns and blood. As of 2015, only 58–61 individuals remain in Ujung Kulon National Park, Java, Indonesia. The last known Javan rhino in Vietnam was reportedly killed for its horn in 2011 by Vietnamese poachers. Now only Java contains the last Javan rhinos.

=== Sumatran ===
The Sumatran rhinoceros (Dicerorhinus sumatrensis) is the smallest extant rhinoceros species, as well as the one with the most hair. It can be found at very high altitudes in Borneo and Sumatra. Because of habitat loss and poaching, their numbers have declined, and it has become the second most threatened rhinoceros. About 275 Sumatran rhinos are believed to remain. There are three subspecies of Sumatran rhinoceros: the Sumatran rhinoceros proper (Dicerorhinus sumatrensis sumatrensis), the Bornean rhinoceros (Dicerorhinus sumatrensis harrissoni) and the possibly extinct Northern Sumatran rhinoceros (Dicerorhinus sumatrensis lasiotis).

A mature rhino typically stands about 1.3 m (4 ft 3 in) high at the shoulder, has a length of 2.4–3.2 m (7 ft 10 in – 10 ft 6 in) and weighs around 700 kg (1,500 lb), though the largest individuals have been known to weigh as much as 1,000 kilograms (2,200 lb). Like the African species, it has two horns; the larger is the front (25–79 centimetres (9.8–31.1 in)), with the smaller usually less than 10 centimetres (3.9 in) long. Males have much larger horns than the females. Hair can range from dense (the densest hair in young calves) to sparse. The color of these rhinos is reddish brown. The body is short and has stubby legs. The lip is prehensile.

Sumatran rhinoceros once were spread across South-east Asia, but now are on the verge of extinction, confined to several parts of Indonesia and Malaysia by reproductive isolation. It has been found through DNA comparison that the Sumatran rhinoceros is the most ancient extant rhinoceros and related to the extinct Eurasian woolly rhino species, Coelodonta. In 1994, Alan Rabinowitz publicly denounced governments, non-governmental organizations, and other institutions for lacking in their attempts to conserve the Sumatran rhinoceros. To conserve it, they would have to relocate them from small forests to breeding programs that could monitor their breeding success. To boost reproduction, the Malaysian and Indonesian governments could also agree to exchange the gametes of the Sumatran and (smaller) Bornean subspecies. The Indonesian and Malaysian governments have also proposed a single management unit for these two ancient subspecies.

== Evolution ==
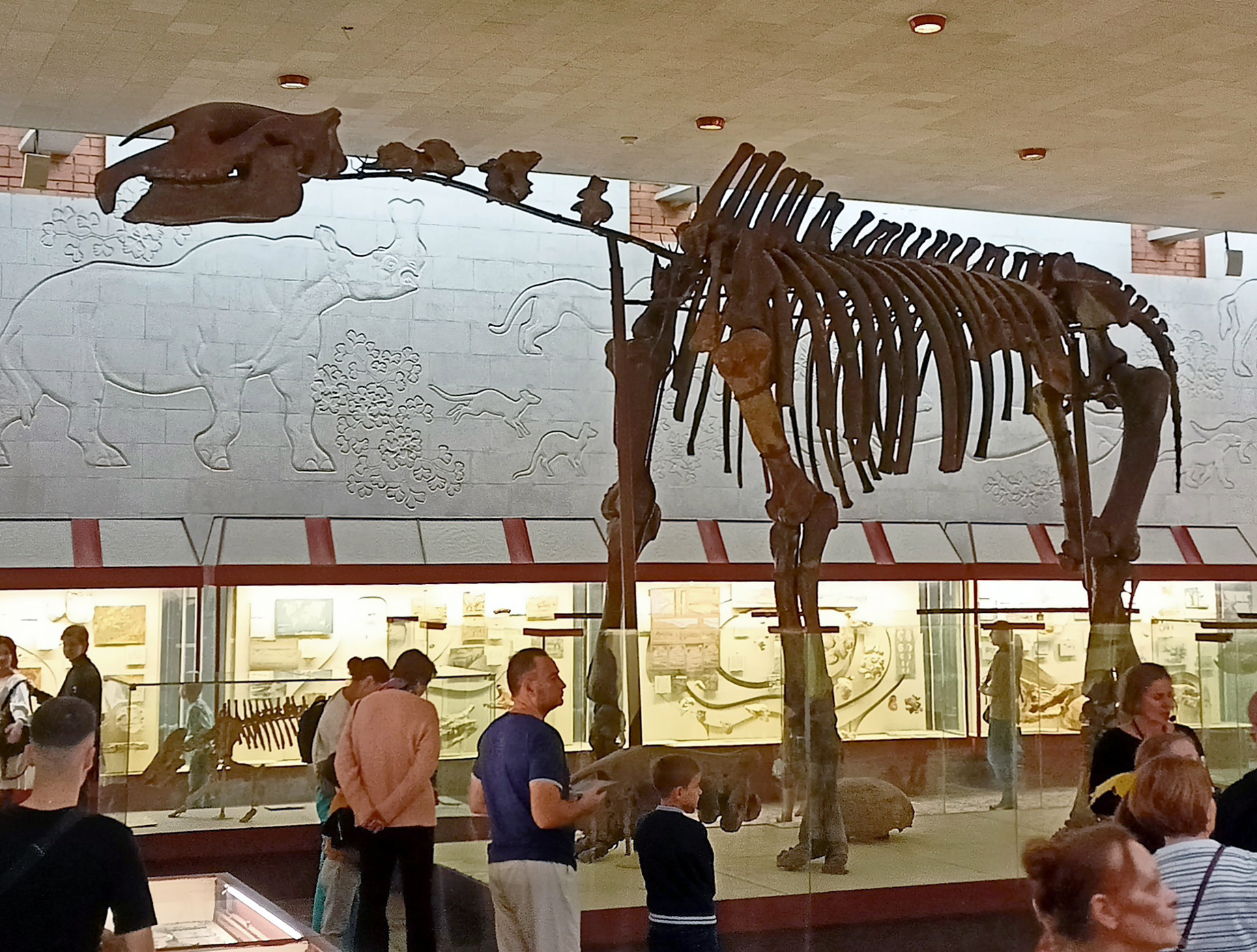
Skeleton of Paraceratherium, an extinct rhinocerotoid belonging to Paraceratheriidae, and one of the largest land mammals ever

The earliest representatives of Rhinocerotoidea appeared during the early-middle Eocene in Asia, around 54 million years ago. The family of modern rhinoceroses, Rhinocerotidae appeared during the middle-late Eocene around 39–40 million years ago, roughly at the same in North America and Asia, with rhinoceroses migrating into Europe at the Eocene-Oligocene boundary ~34 million years ago as part of the "Grande Coupure" along with many other Asian migrants. Rhinocerotids represented the only living family of rhinocerotoids following the end of the Oligocene epoch around 23 million and the extinction of other rhinocerotoid groups such as the giant paraceratheres. During the early Miocene epoch, around 20 million years ago rhinocerotids migrated into Africa following its connection to Eurasia.

The last common ancestor of living rhinoceroses (which belong to the subgroup Rhinocerotina) is thought to have lived during the Miocene, at least 15–16 million years ago. Rhinocerotids reached maximum diversity during the Miocene epoch, with often 4–5 species of rhinoceros coexisting with each other at any location in Eurasia, up to 9 in South Asia, which include members of the living group Rhinocerotina, as well as the extinct groups Teleoceratini, Aceratheriinae, and Elasmotheriinae. Rhinocertoids declined in diversity during the late Miocene following unfavourable climatic change, becoming entirely extinct in North America at the beginning of the Pliocene, around 5 million years ago, with Teleoceratini and Aceratheriinae having become extinct by or during the Early Pliocene.

The earliest remains of the genus Rhinoceros (which includes the living Indian/one horned and Javan rhinoceros) are known from the Late Miocene, represented by remains such as an indeterminate species found in deposits in Myanmar dating to around 8-9 million years ago, with the two modern species appearing during the Early-Middle Pleistocene epoch. The earliest unambiguous relatives of white and black rhinoceros belonging to the genera Ceratotherium and Diceros, first appear during the late Miocene, with the first unambiguous appearance of modern white and black rhinoceros during the Early Pleistocene. The earliest unambiguous remains of Dicerorhinus are known from the latest Pliocene, with the appearance of the modern Sumatran rhinoceros during the Early Pleistocene.

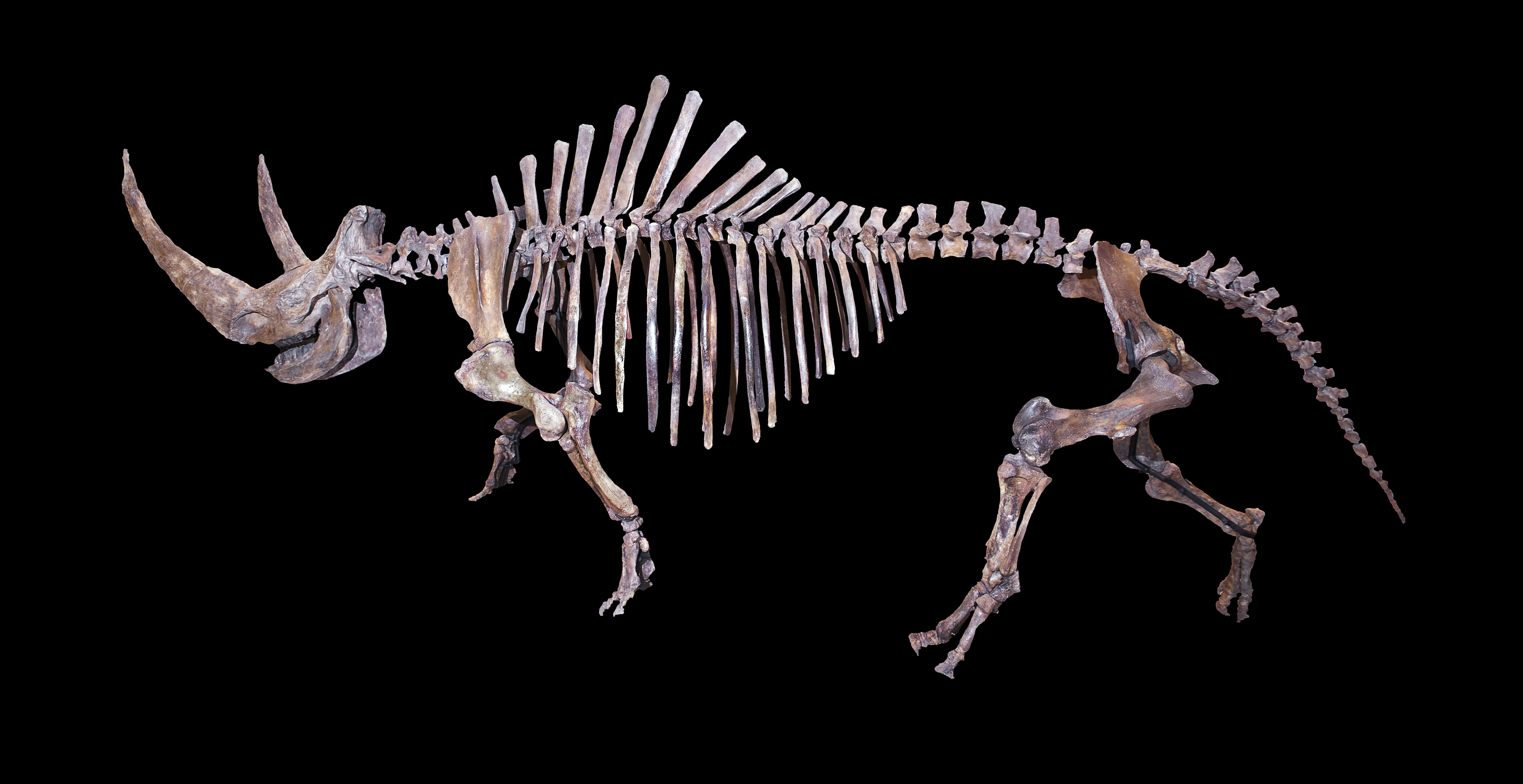
Skeleton of a woolly rhinoceros (Coelodonta antiquitatis) MHNT

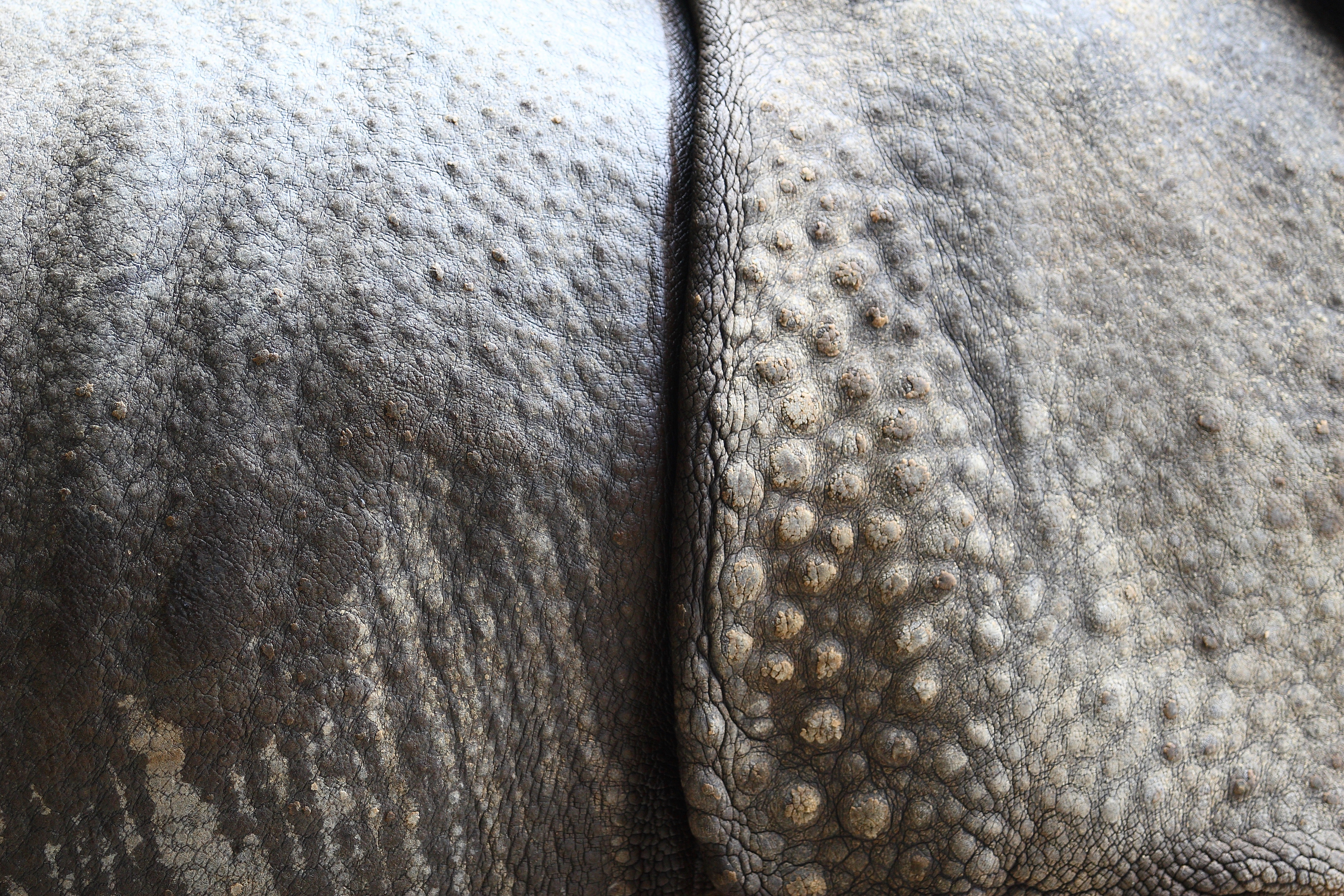
The thick dermal armour of the rhinoceros evolved at the same time as shearing tusks.

Alongside the extant species, four additional species of rhinoceros survived into the Last Glacial Period: the woolly rhinoceros (Coelodonta antiquitatis), Elasmotherium sibiricum and two species of Stephanorhinus, Merck's rhinoceros (Stephanorhinus kirchbergensis) and the narrow-nosed rhinoceros (Stephanorhinus hemitoechus).

Cladogram showing the relationships of recent and Late Pleistocene rhinoceros species (minus Stephanorhinus hemitoechus) based on whole nuclear genomes, after Liu et al., 2021:

- - Elasmotheriinae
    †Elasmotherium sibiricum
  - Rhinocerotinae
    - - White rhinoceros (Ceratotherium simum)
      - Black rhinoceros (Diceros bicornis)
    - - - - † Woolly rhinoceros (Coelodonta antiquitatis)
          - † Merck's rhinoceros (Stephanorhinus kirchbergensis)
        - Sumatran rhinoceros (Dicerorhinus sumatrensis)
      - - Javan rhinoceros (Rhinoceros sondaicus)
        - Indian rhinoceros (Rhinoceros unicornis)

† denotes extinct taxa

=== Subfamilies and genera ===
- Family Rhinocerotidae
  - †Teletaceras
  - †Uintaceras
  - †Epiaceratherium
  - †Trigonias
  - †Ronzotherium
  - †Diceratherium
  - †Menoceras
  - †Subhyracodon
  - †Symphysorrhachis
  - †Molassitherium
  - †Guixia
  - Subfamily Aceratheriinae (sometimes placed in Rhinocerotinae as Aceratheriina)
    - †Alicornops
    - †Aprotodon
    - †Acerorhinus
    - †Aphelops
    - †Hoploaceratherium
    - †Persiatherium
    - †Brachydiceratherium
    - †Diaceratherium
    - †Dromoceratherium
    - †Floridaceras
    - †Galushaceras
    - †Chilotheridium
    - †Mesaceratherium
    - †Plesiaceratherium
    - †Proaceratherium
    - Tribe Aceratheriini
      - †Acerorhinus?
      - †Aphelops?
      - †Hoploaceratherium?
      - †Persiatherium?
      - †Aceratherium
      - †Subchilotherium
      - †Peraceras
      - †Chilotherium
      - †Shansirhinus
    - Tribe Teleoceratini? (sometimes placed as a separate group)
      - †Alicornops?
      - †Teleoceras
      - †Brachypotherium
      - †Prosantorhinus
  - Subfamily Rhinocerotinae
    - Subtribe Rhinocerotina (also used to encompass all modern rhinoceroses)
      - †Nesorhinus
      - Rhinoceros – Indian & Javan rhinoceros
    - Tribe Dicerorhinini or Subtribe Dicerorhinina (also known as the "DCS clade")
      - †Pliorhinus
      - †Coelodonta – Woolly rhinoceros
      - Dicerorhinus – Sumatran rhinoceros
      - †Dihoplus
      - †Stephanorhinus – Merck's rhinoceros & Narrow-nosed rhinoceros
      - †Scythicorhinus
    - Tribe Dicerotini/Diceroti or Subtribe Dicerotina
      - Ceratotherium – White rhinoceros
      - Diceros – Black rhinoceros
      - †Paradiceros
      - †Miodiceros?
    - Rhinocerotinae incertae sedis
      - †Protaceratherium
      - †Lartetotherium
      - †Gaindatherium
      - †Rusingaceros
  - Subfamily Elasmotheriinae
    - †Gulfoceras?
    - †Penetrigonias?
    - †Subhyracodon?
    - †Menoceras?
    - †Diceratherium?
    - Tribe Elasmotheriini / Subtribe Elasmotheriina
      - †Bugtirhinus
      - †Caementodon
      - †Elasmotherium
      - †Eoazara
      - †Hispanotherium
      - †Iranotherium
      - †Victoriaceros?
      - †Kenyatherium
      - †Meninatherium
      - †Samburuceros
      - †Ningxiatherium
      - †Ougandatherium
      - †Parelasmotherium
      - †Procoelodonta
      - †Sinotherium

== Predators, poaching and hunting ==
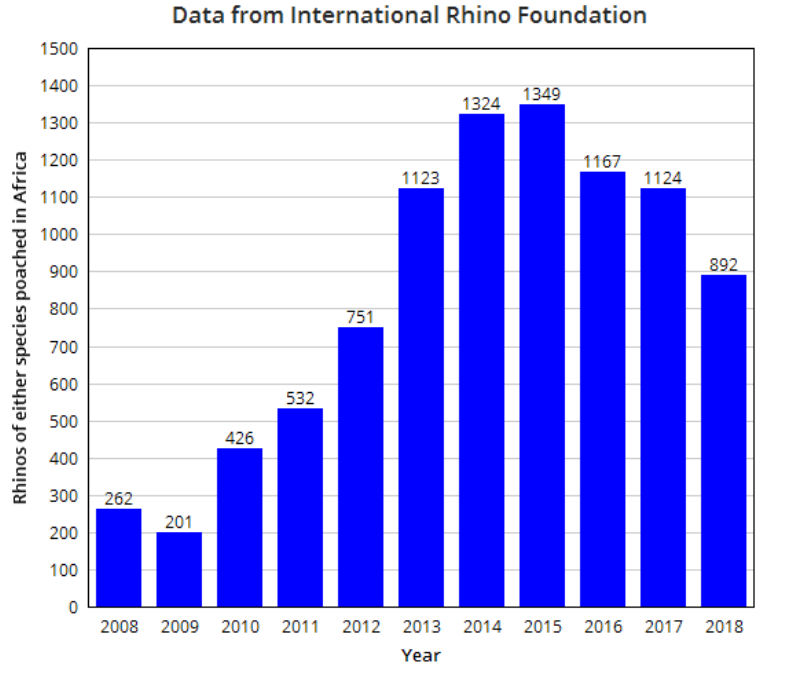
Graph showing the number of rhinos poached annually in Africa (2008–2018)

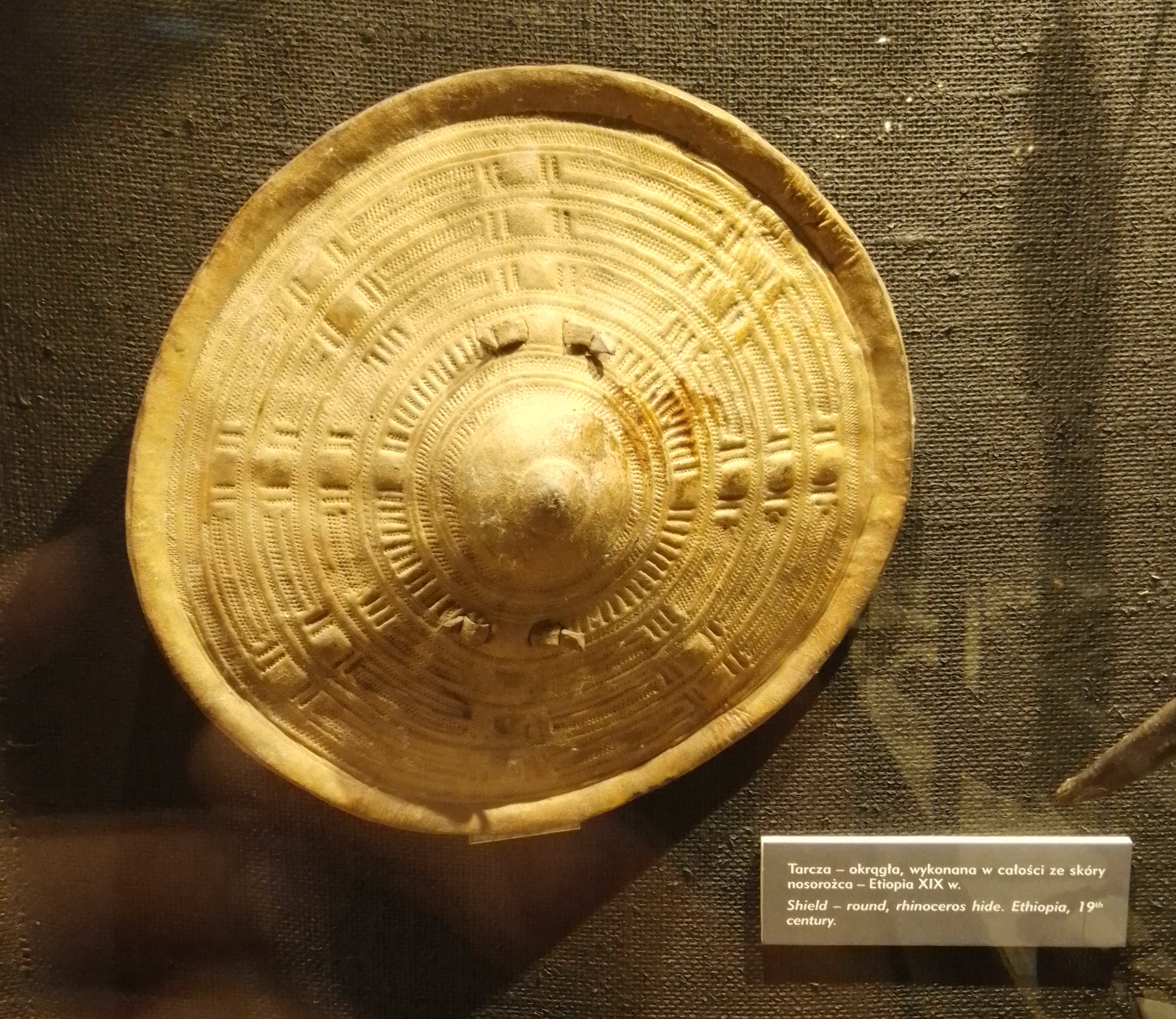
An Ethiopian shield from rhinoceros skin, 19th century

Adult rhinoceroses have no real predators in the wild, other than humans. Young rhinos sometimes fall prey to big cats, crocodiles, African wild dogs, and hyenas.

Although rhinos are large and aggressive and have a reputation for being resilient, they are very easily poached; they visit water holes daily and can be easily killed while they drink. As of December 2009, poaching increased globally while efforts to protect the rhino are considered increasingly ineffective. The most serious estimate, that only 3% of poachers are successfully countered, is reported of Zimbabwe, while Nepal has largely avoided the crisis. Poachers have become more sophisticated. South African officials have called for urgent action against poaching after poachers killed the last female rhino in the Krugersdorp Game Reserve near Johannesburg. Statistics from South African National Parks show that 333 rhinoceroses were killed in South Africa in 2010, increasing to 668 by 2012, over 1,004 in 2013, and over 1,338 killed in 2015. In some cases rhinos are tranquilized and their horns removed leaving them to bleed to death, while in other instances more than the horn is taken.

The Namibian government has supported the practice of rhino trophy hunting as a way to raise money for conservation. Hunting licenses for five Namibian black rhinos are auctioned annually, with the money going to the government's Game Products Trust Fund. Some conservationists and members of the public oppose or question this practice.

== Horn use ==
Weight of seized rhinoceros horns, 2018

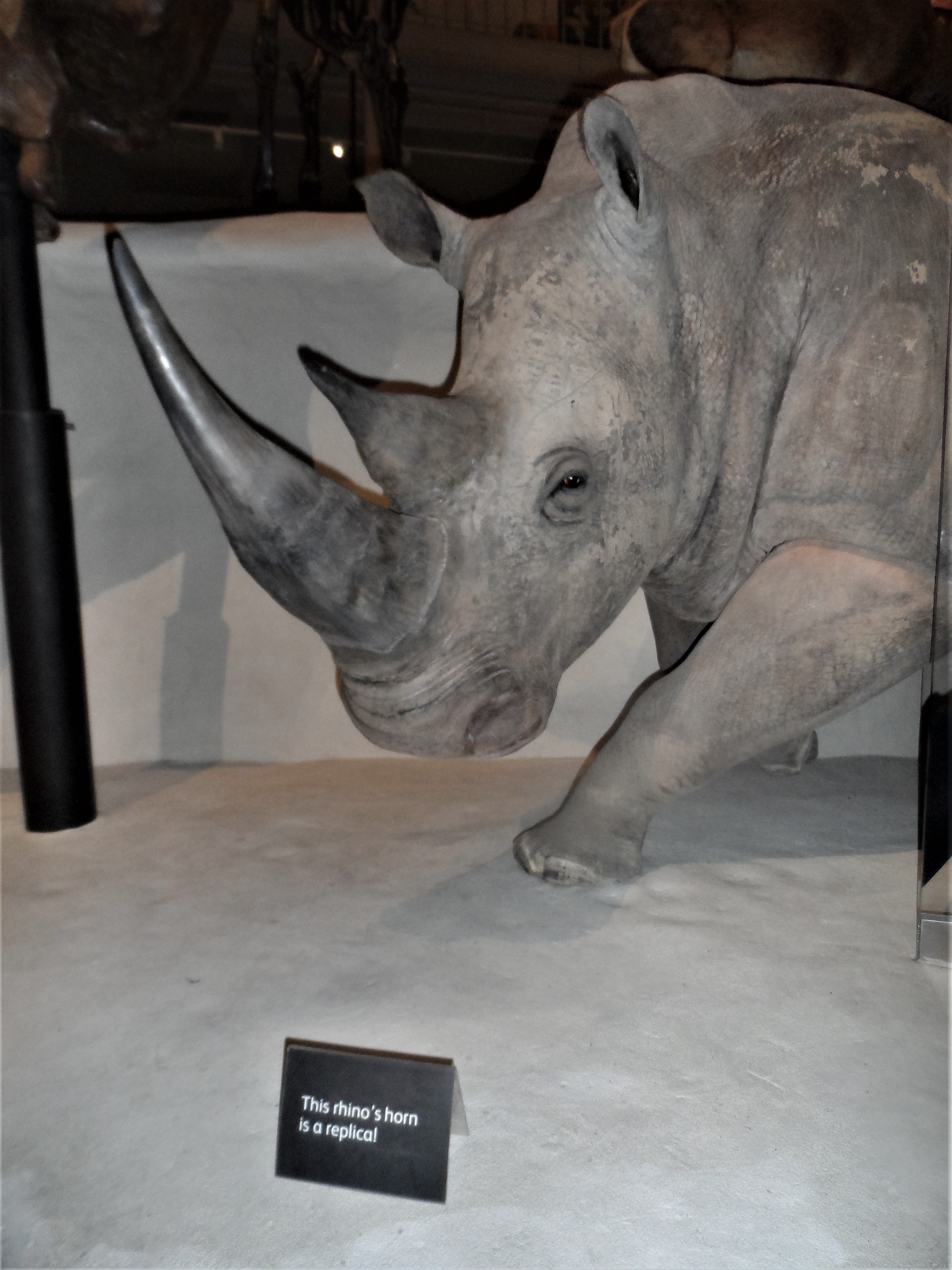
Sign in the National Museum of Scotland notifying visitors that the horn on display is a replica; this is because several rhinoceros horns have been stolen from museums.

Rhinoceros horns develop from subcutaneous tissues, and are made of keratinous mineralized compartments. The horns root in a germinative layer.

Rhinoceros horns are used in traditional medicines in parts of Asia, and for dagger handles in Yemen and Oman. Esmond Bradley Martin has rgeneral eported on the trade for dagger handles in Yemen, which was historically a major source for the demand for rhino horn in the late 20th century. In Europe, it was historically believed that rhino horns could purify water and could detect poisoned liquids, and likely believed to be an aphrodisiac and an antidote to poison.

It is a common misconception that rhinoceros horn in powdered form is used as an aphrodisiac or a cure for cancer in traditional Chinese medicine (TCM) as Cornu Rhinoceri Asiatici (犀角, xījiǎo, "rhinoceros horn"). In TCM, rhino horn is sometimes prescribed for fevers and convulsions, a treatment not supported by evidence-based medicine: this treatment has been compared to consuming fingernail clippings in water. In a 2021 survey of Chinese users of rhinoceros horn TCM products, the vast majority of respondents cited "dispelling heat" and "detoxification" as reasons for using rhino horn. In 1993, China signed the CITES treaty and removed rhinoceros horn from the Chinese medicine pharmacopeia, administered by the Ministry of Health. In 2011, the Register of Chinese Herbal Medicine in the United Kingdom issued a formal statement condemning the use of rhinoceros horn. A growing number of TCM educators are also speaking out against the practice, although some TCM practitioners still believe that it is a life-saving medicine.

Vietnam reportedly has the biggest number of rhino horn consumers, with their demand driving most of the poaching, which has risen to record levels. The "Vietnam CITES Management Authority" has claimed that Hanoi recently experienced a 77% drop in the usage of rhino horn, but National Geographic has challenged these claims, noticing that there was no rise in the numbers of criminals who were apprehended or prosecuted. South African rhino poaching's main destination market is Vietnam. An average sized horn can bring in as much as a quarter of a million dollars in Vietnam and many rhino range states have stockpiles of rhino horn.

== Horn trade ==
International trade in rhinoceros horn has been declared illegal by the Convention on International Trade in Endangered Species of Wild Fauna and Flora (CITES) since 1977. A proposal by Swaziland to lift the international ban was rejected in October 2016. Domestic sale of rhinoceros horn in South Africa, home of 80% of the remaining rhino population, was banned as of 2009. The ban was overturned in a court case in 2017, and South Africa plans to draft regulations for the sale of rhino horn, possibly including export for "non-commercial purposes". The South African government has proposed that a legal trade of rhino horn be established, arguing that this could reduce poaching and prevent the extinction of this species.

In March 2013, some researchers suggested that the only way to reduce poaching would be to establish a regulated trade based on humane and renewable harvesting from live rhinos. The World Wildlife Fund opposes legalization of the horn trade, as it may increase demand, while IFAW released a report by EcoLarge, suggesting that more thorough knowledge of economic factors is required to justify the pro-trade option.

== Conservation ==
According to the World Wide Fund for Nature, conservation of African rhinoceroses as consumers of large amounts of vegetation is crucial to maintaining the shape of the African landscape and the natural resources of local communities.

=== Ways to prevent poaching ===
==== Horn removal ====
To prevent poaching, in certain areas, rhinos have been tranquillized and their horns removed. Armed park rangers, particularly in South Africa, are also working on the front lines to combat poaching, sometimes killing poachers who are caught in the act. A 2012 spike in rhino killings increased concerns about the future of the species. A 2025 Science study found that dehorning led to a 78% reduction in poaching.

==== Horn poisoning ====
In 2011, the Rhino Rescue Project began a horn-trade control method consisting of infusing the horns of living rhinos with a mixture of a pink dye and an acaricide (to kill ticks) which is safe for rhinos but toxic to humans. The procedure also includes inserting three RFID identification chips and taking DNA samples. Because of the fibrous nature of rhino horn, the pressurized dye infuses the interior of the horn but does not color the surface or affect rhino behavior. Depending on the quantity of horn a person consumes, experts believe the acaricide would cause nausea, stomach-ache, and diarrhea, and possibly convulsions. It would not be fatal—the primary deterrent is the knowledge that the treatment has been applied, communicated by signs posted at the refuges. The original idea grew out of research into the horn as a reservoir for one-time tick treatments, and experts selected an acaricide they think is safe for the rhino, oxpeckers, vultures, and other animals in the preserve's ecosystem. Proponents claim that the dye cannot be removed from the horns, and remains visible on X-ray scanners even when the horn is ground to a fine powder.

The UK charity organization Save the Rhino has criticized horn poisoning on moral and practical grounds. The organization questions the assumptions that the infusion technique works as intended, and that even if the poison were effective, whether middlemen in a lucrative, illegal trade would care much about the effect it would have on buyers. Additionally, rhino horn is increasingly purchased for decorative use, rather than for use in traditional medicine. Save the Rhino questions the feasibility of applying the technique to all African rhinos, since workers would have to reapply the acaricide every four years. It was also reported that one out of 150 rhinos treated did not survive the anesthesia.

==== Artificial substitute for rhinoceros horn ====
Another way to undercut the rhinoceros horn market has been suggested by Matthew Markus of Pembient, a biotechnology firm. He proposes the synthesis of an artificial substitute for rhinoceros horn. To enable authorities to distinguish the bioengineered horn from real rhinoceros horn, the genetic code of the bioengineered horn could be registered, similar to the DNA of living rhinoceros in the RhODIS (Rhino DNA Index System). Initial responses from many conservationists were negative, but a 2016 report from TRAFFIC—which monitors trade in wildlife and animal parts—conceded that it "...would be rash to rule out the possibility that trade in synthetic rhinoceros horn could play a role in future conservation strategies".

== Historical representations ==
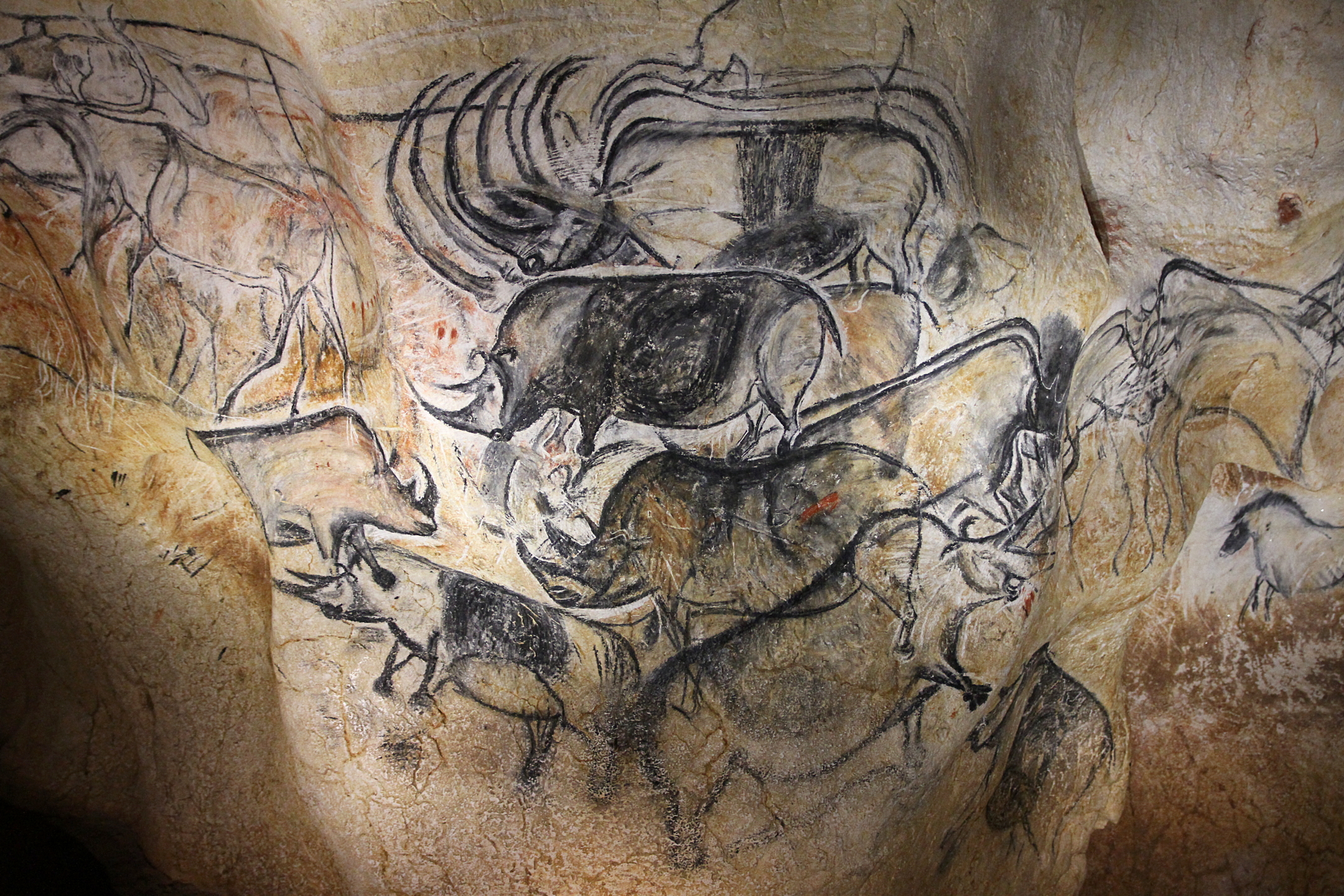
Upper Paleolithic cave paintings of woolly rhinoceros at Chauvet cave, France (replica)

Woolly rhinoceroses are depicted the European Paleolithic art, such as in cave paintings in Chauvet Cave in France, which date to around 30-40,000 years ago.

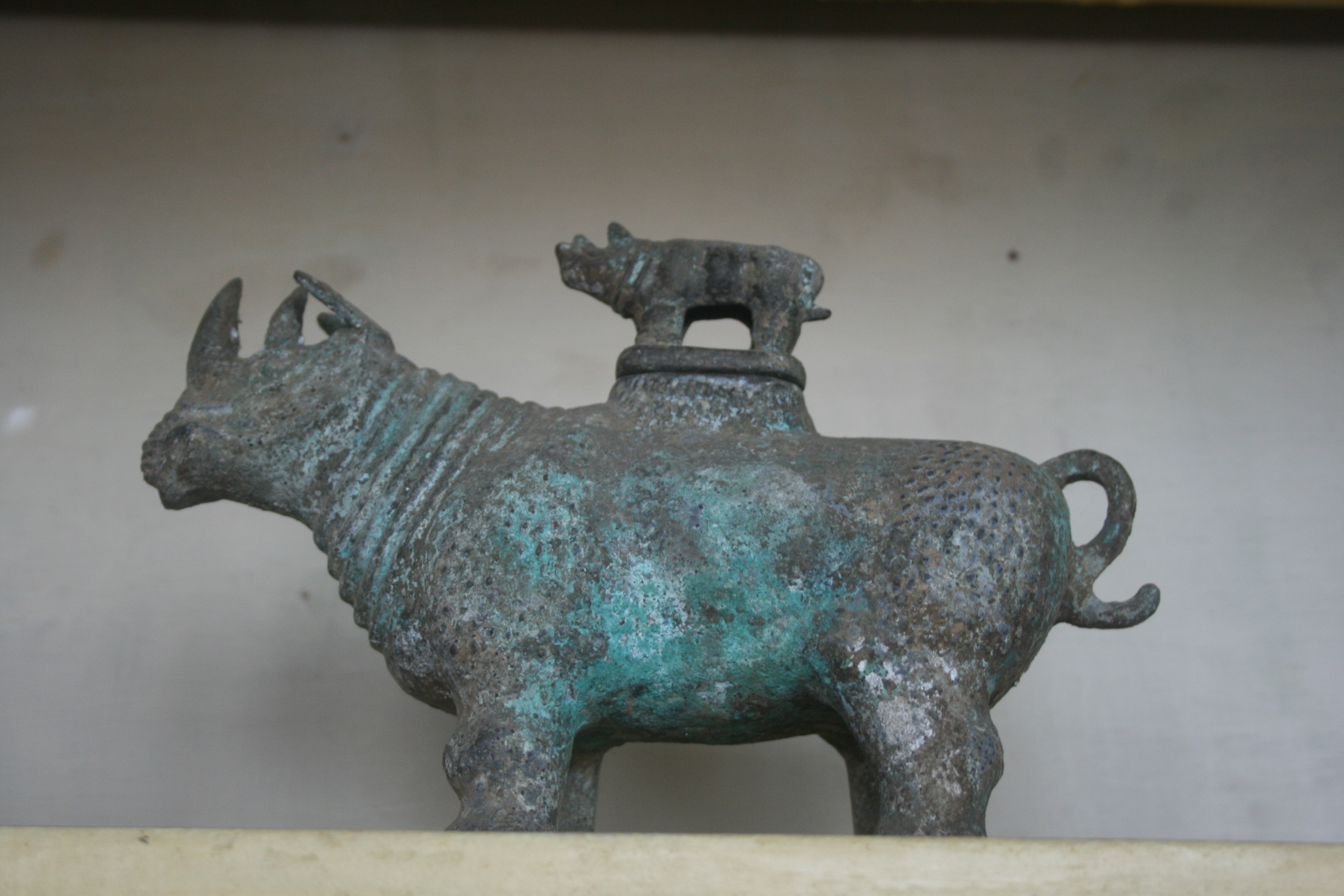
Western Zhou bronze rhino

Greek historian and geographer Agatharchides (2nd century BC) mentions the rhinoceros in his book On the Erythraean Sea.

In Khmer art, the Hindu god Agni is depicted with a rhinoceros as his vahana. Similarly in medieval era Thai literature, Agni also called Phra Phloeng is sometimes described as riding a rhinoceros.

Albrecht Dürer created a famous woodcut of a rhinoceros in 1515, based on a written description and brief sketch by Valentim Fernandes, a German printer resident in Lisbon. He never saw the animal itself, so Dürer's Rhinoceros is a somewhat inaccurate depiction.

There are legends about rhinoceroses stamping out fire in Burma, India, and Malaysia. The mythical rhinoceros has a special name in Malay, badak api, wherein badak means rhinoceros, and api means fire. The animal would come when a fire was lit in the forest and stamp it out. There are no recent confirmations of this phenomenon. This legend was depicted in the film The Gods Must Be Crazy (1980), which shows an African rhinoceros putting out two campfires.

In 1974, a lavender rhinoceros symbol began to be used as a symbol of the gay community in Boston, United States.

Rhinoceroses in art

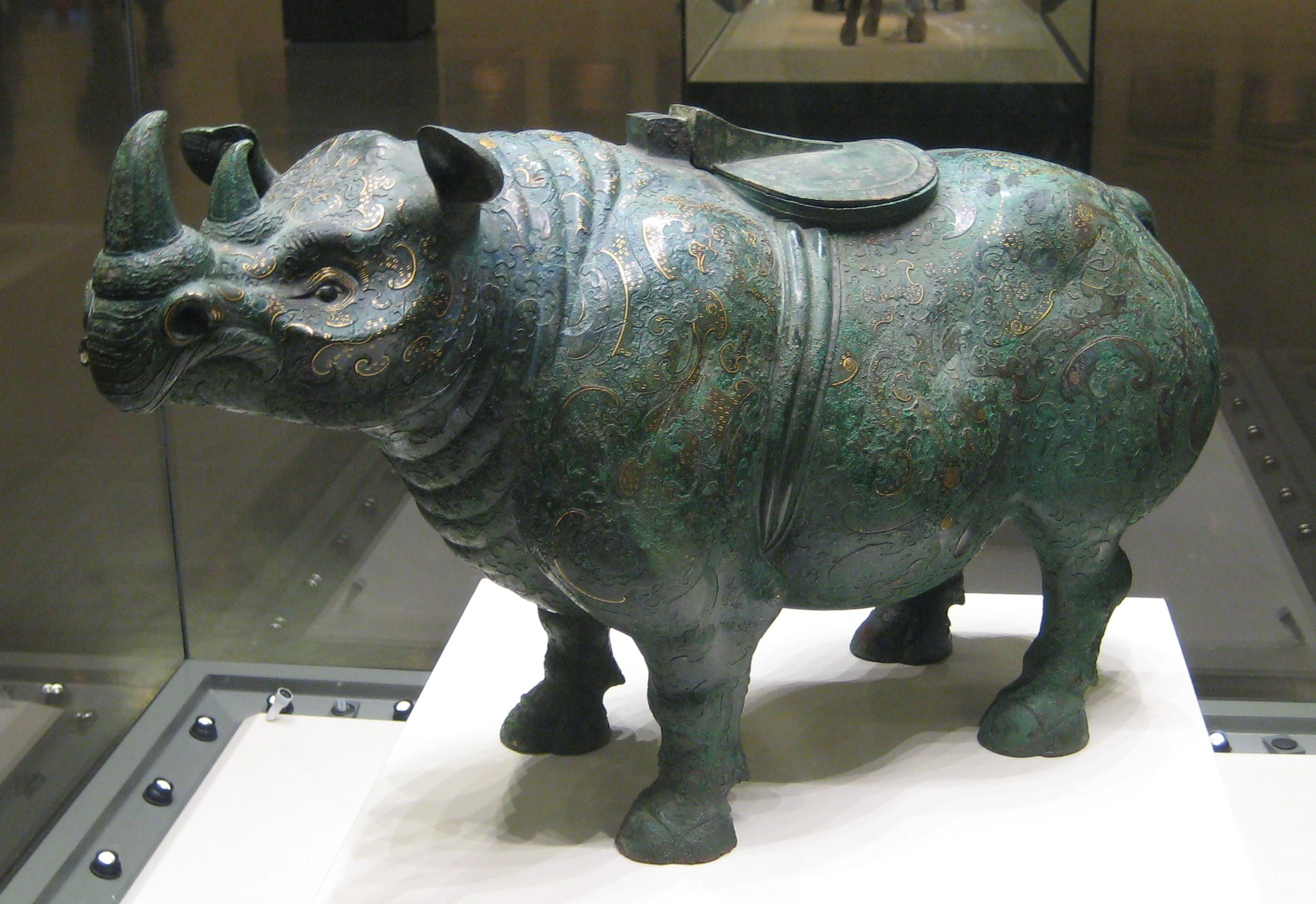
A wine vessel in the form of a bronze rhinoceros with silver inlay, from the Western Han (202 BC – 9 AD) period of China, sporting a saddle on its back

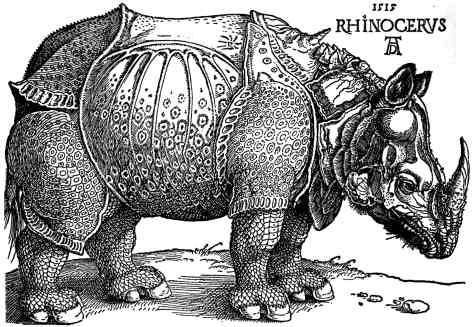
Dürer's Rhinoceros, an Albrecht Dürer woodcut from 1515

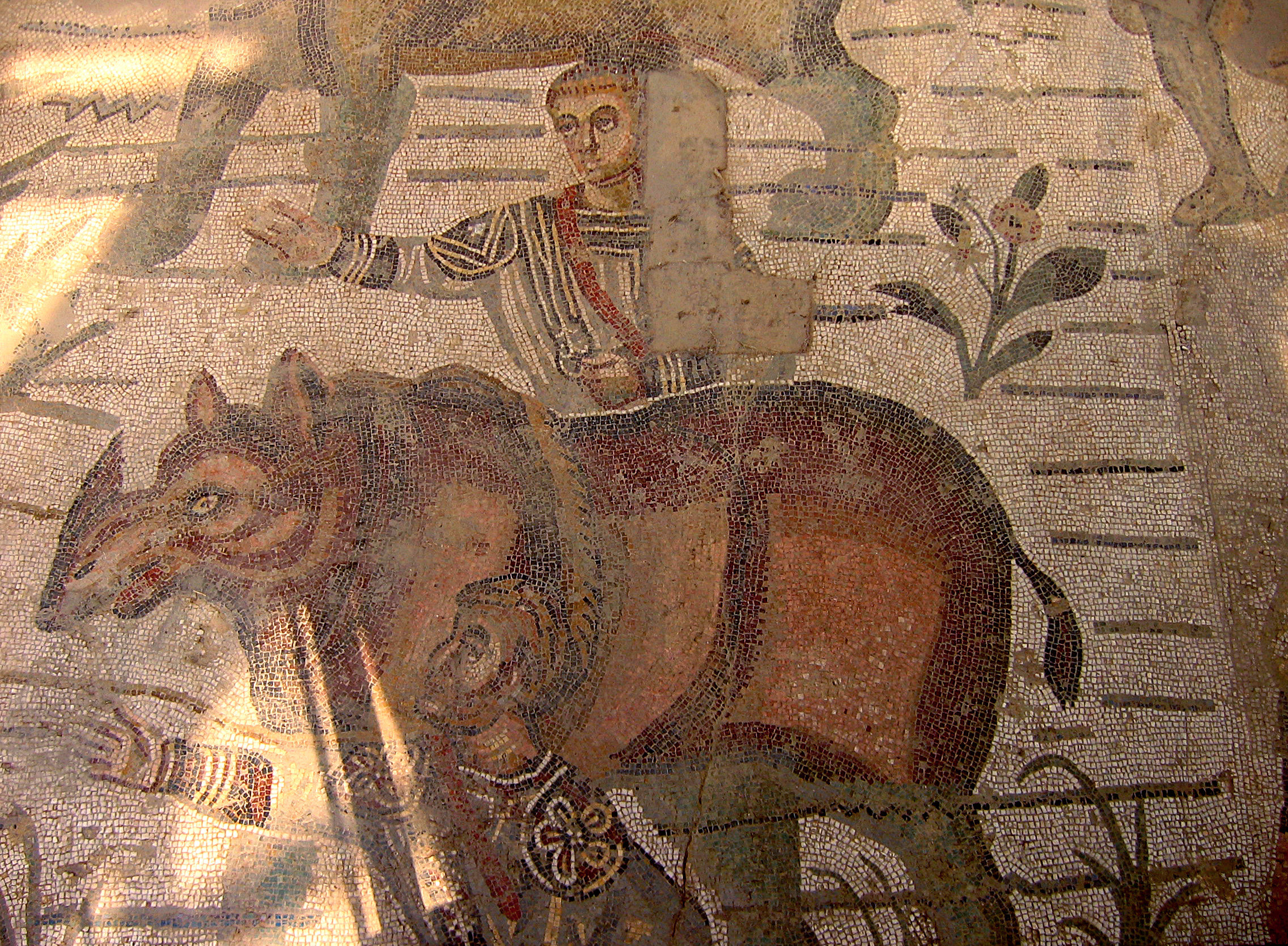
A rhinoceros depicted on a Roman mosaic in Villa Romana del Casale, an archaeological site near Piazza Armerina in Sicily, Italy

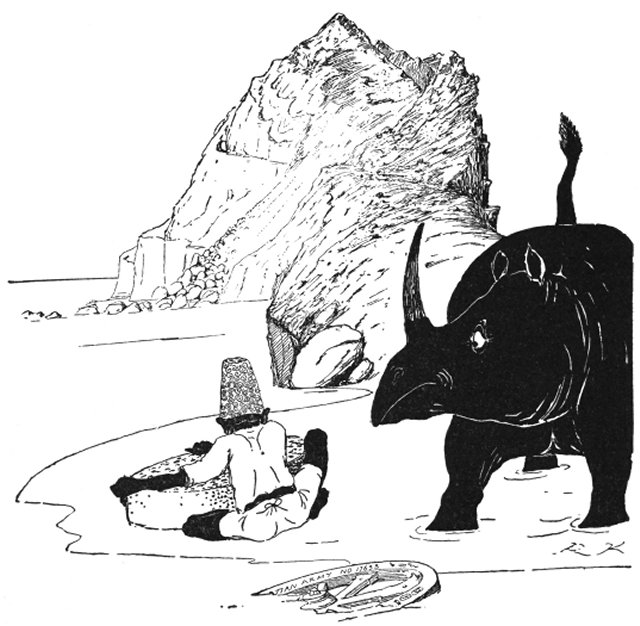
How the Rhinoceros Got His Skin from Rudyard Kipling's Just So Stories from 1902

A lavender rhinoceros, a symbol used as a sign of gay visibility

== See also ==
=== Conservation ===
- Bardiya National Park
- Chitwan National Park
- Care For Wild Rhino Sanctuary
- International Rhino Foundation
- Kaziranga National Park
- List of odd-toed ungulates by population
- Nicolaas Jan van Strien
- Save the Rhino
- TRAFFIC

=== Individual rhinoceroses ===
- Abada
- Clara
- List of fictional ungulates
- Rhinoceros of Versailles

=== Literature ===
- Rhinoceros, 1959 play

=== Other ===
- Rhinoceroses in ancient China
