= Royal Menagerie of Versailles =

Building in Yvelines, France 1663–1800

Coordinates: 48.8037°N 2.0944°E

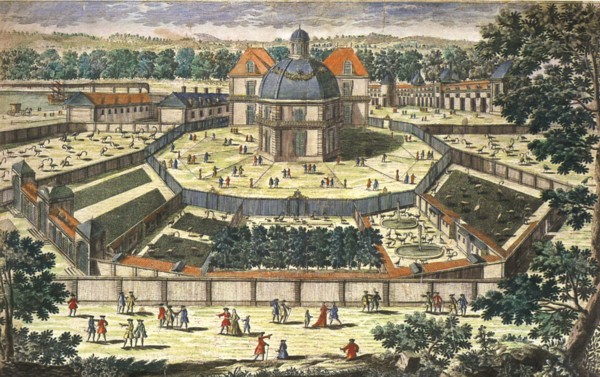
The Menagerie of Versailles founded by Louis XIV, engraving by Pierre Aveline.

The Ménagerie royale de Versailles (literal French for "Royal Menagerie of Versailles") was Louis XIV's first major project at Versailles. It was built even before the creation of the Grand Canal. Its construction was entrusted to the architect Louis Le Vau, who began work in 1663. Abandoned during the French Revolution, it fell into ruin and no longer exists today.

== Under Louis XIV ==
Its construction was entrusted to the architect Louis Le Vau, who began work in 1663. The menagerie was built between 1662 and 1664, at the southern end of the future Grand Canal, along the road between Versailles and Saint-Cyr, but was not fully completed until 1668.

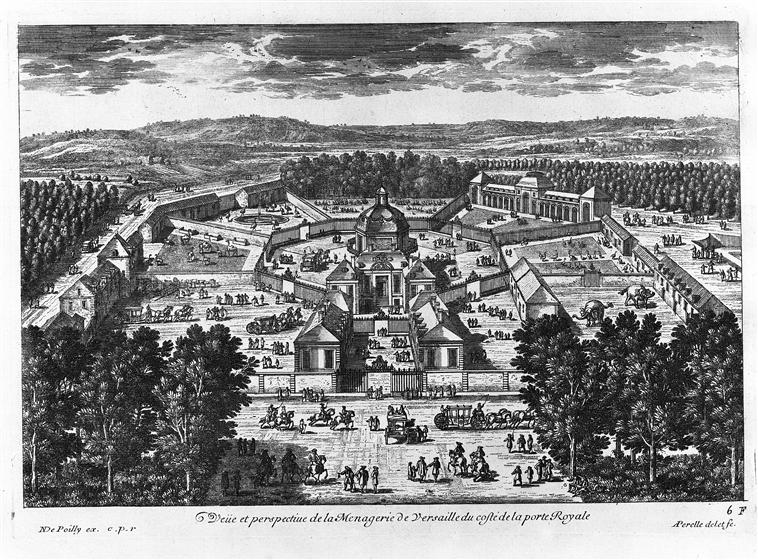
View and perspective of the Menagerie of Versailles from the Porte Royale, engraving by Adam Pérelle after Nicolas de Poilly (17th century).

It is centred around an octagonal building covered by a slate dome. This building is surrounded by an octagonal courtyard opening onto seven courtyards separated by gates and walls for birds and exotic animals. A balcony surrounds the first floor of the building, providing a view of the various fan-shaped enclosures. At the front of the building is a courtyard of honor. Regarding the general layout of the menagerie and animal courtyards, Louis Le Vau was inspired by the aviary of the Roman patrician Priscus at Casinum, which he probably knew from an engraving by Pirro Ligorio. This gave rise to the idea of a castle opening onto a pavilion whose shape was reproduced by the surrounding enclosures.

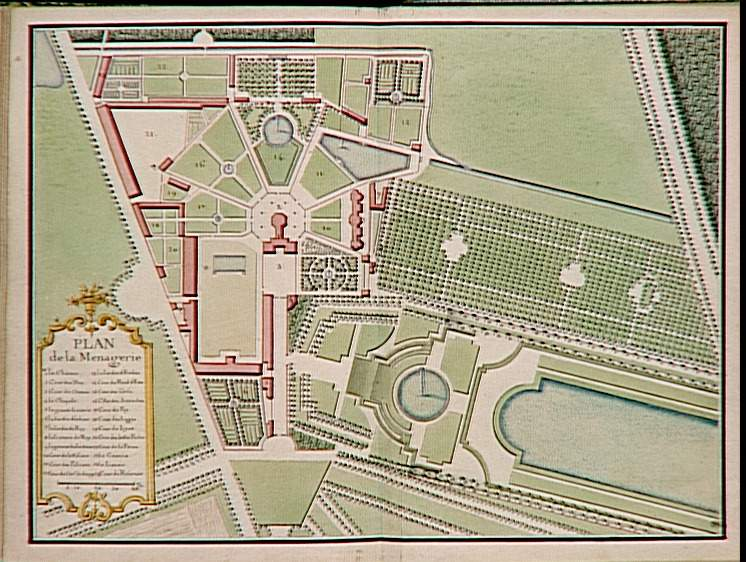
Plan of the menagerie under Louis XV (1747), Palace of Versailles.

Conceived as a place of pageantry, the Menagerie of Versailles was intended to be a place of splendor and wonder, where visitors could discover exotic and wild animals from all over the world. It was a popular destination for strolls and an essential stop-off point for Louis XIV's grand parties and receptions. It was at the menagerie that the whole of the Lumières d'Europe came to see, among other things, hummingbirds, parrots, ostriches, an elephant and a dromedary.

Unlike the menagerie at the Château de Vincennes, created in 1661 by Louis XIV for the show of fighting wild animals, the Menagerie of Versailles was a place of pleasure and discovery for the court, visitors, artists and scientists. Surgeons, zoologists and taxidermists frequented the menagerie, as did animal painters such as Pierre Puget and Nicasius Bernaerts.

The menagerie was also a political tool to demonstrate the king's power. He therefore instructed his main minister, Colbert, to bring in these exotic, rare and strange animals from all over the world, through purchases from the French East India Company. Colbert initially approached Nicolas Arnoult, the treasurer of the galleys, as almost all the animals had to transit through the port of Marseille - and to a lesser extent Toulon. But the mortality rate among the animals was very high, and most of them did not survive the trip, especially as, no doubt for reasons of ease of capture, it was very young animals that were sent. To reduce this mortality rate, Colbert requested from 1669 that deliveries should only be made in summer. He also asked Arnoult for skins and plant essences for Versailles, and therefore asked him to appoint a person solely responsible for supplying the menagerie with animals. Mosnier Gassion was appointed and he had to travel to the Levant, Egypt and Tunisia to obtain supplies. He made around forty trips, bringing back ostriches and ducks from Egypt. His brother was based in Alexandria. From then on, probably around 1691, the menagerie became more diversified.

The menagerie also housed animals offered to the king as diplomatic gifts, such as an elephant from Congo presented by Peter II of Portugal (Note: According to records the elephant donated by Peter II of Portugal, was fed with 80 pounds of bread, 12 pints of wine and two buckets of soup every day. The animal lived until 1681, and the King attended its dissection, during which it was discovered that it was a female and not a male, as had been believed since its arrival at the menagerie.) in 1668, and felines from Arab princes.

Nobles from many European courts imitated the splendor of Versailles by creating their own menagerie. These included the Château de Chantilly in 1663, the Het Loo Palace in the Netherlands in 1672, the Belém Palace in Lisbon in 1726, the Retiro Park in Madrid in 1774, the Belvedere Palace in Vienna in 1716 and the Sanssouci Palace in Potsdam.

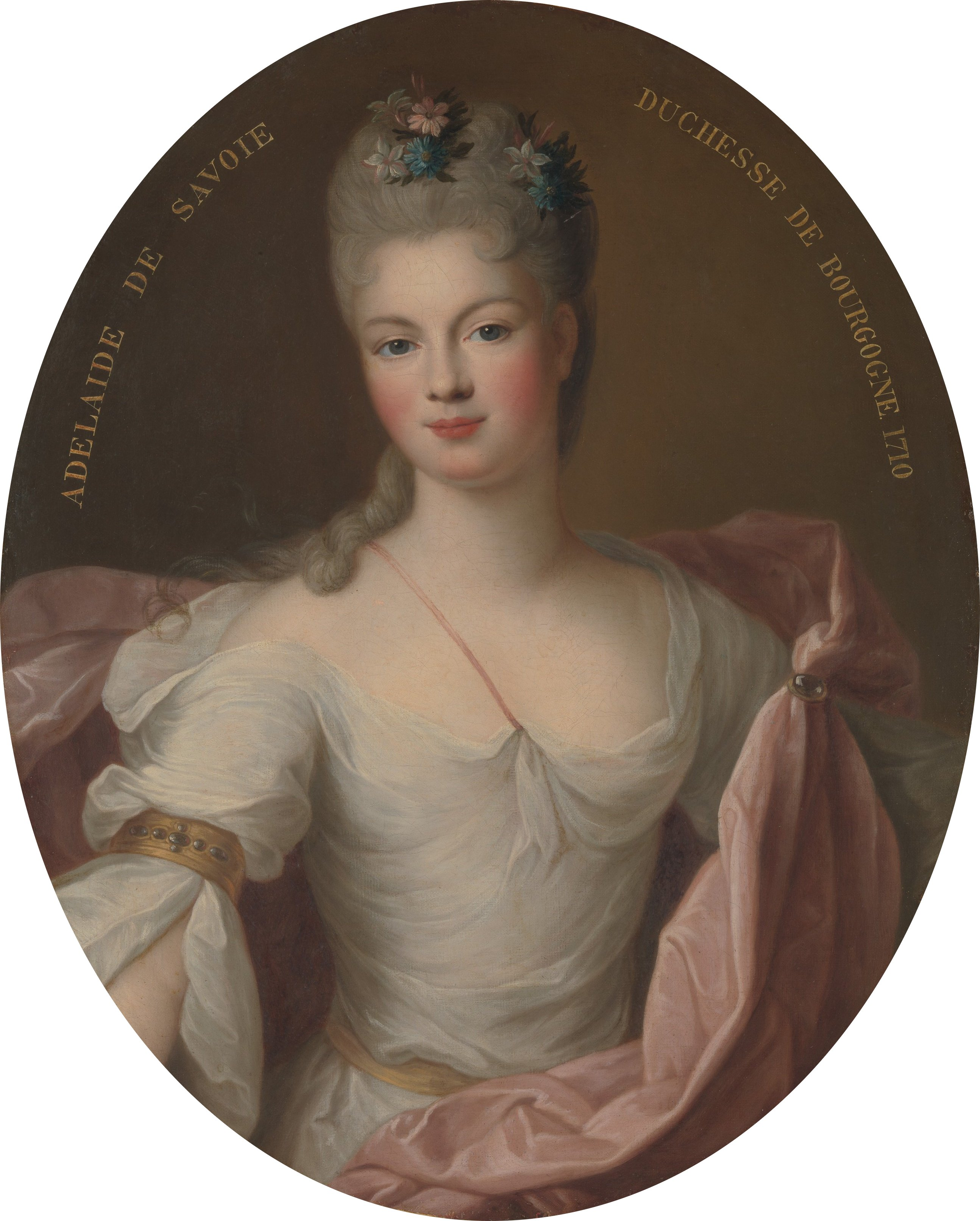
Pierre Gobert, Portrait of Marie Adélaïde of Savoy, Duchess of Burgundy (1710), New York, Metropolitan Museum of Art.

Louis XIV, who was approaching sixty and tired of exotic animals, had the menagerie enlarged and restored in 1698 by Jules Hardouin-Mansart, as a gift for Marie-Adélaïde de Savoie, Duchess of Burgundy, then aged 12 and who had arrived at the court a year earlier to become the wife of the Dauphin Louis of France, the King's grandson. The Duchess, who was to become an energetic wife and brighten up the court, also used the menagerie as an afternoon residence. The menagerie had a pleasure garden, a "cool" room with water features and rockwork, and even a chapel. Farm buildings with outbuildings, stables, farmyard, dovecote, dairy and vegetable garden were added.

Marie-Adélaïde enjoyed churning and playing the peasant. The Château de Plaisance overlooking the menagerie was also the setting for her adulterous love affairs.

In 1711, the Norman privateer Jean Doublet brought back two llamas, animals that were still unknown at the court and described as "strange male and female sheep".

Marie-Adélaïde died in 1712 at the age of 26 in a measles epidemic that also took the lives of one of her sons and her husband, marking the beginning of the decline of the menagerie.

Artists' views

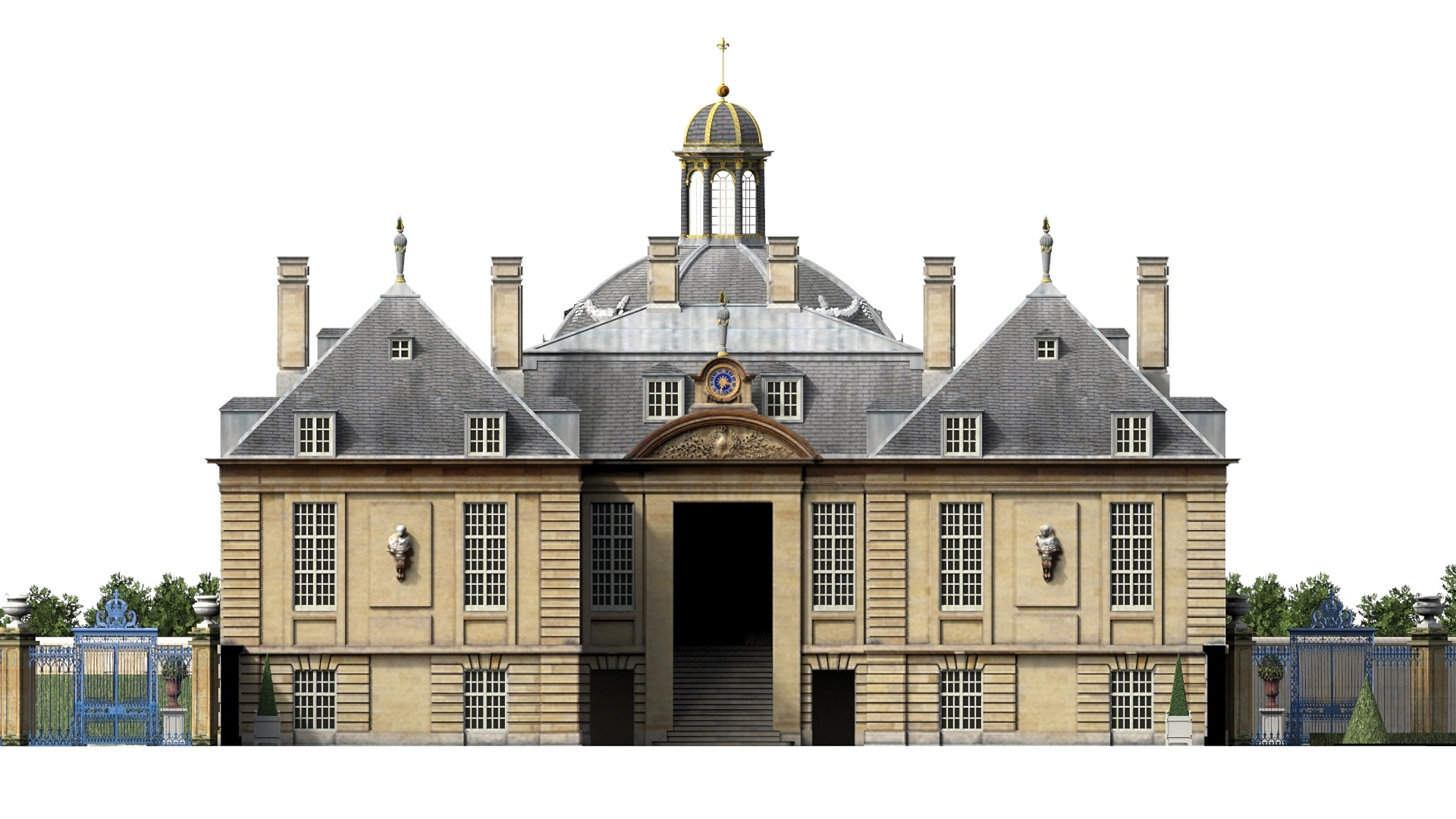
Restoration of the façade of the Menagerie at Versailles.

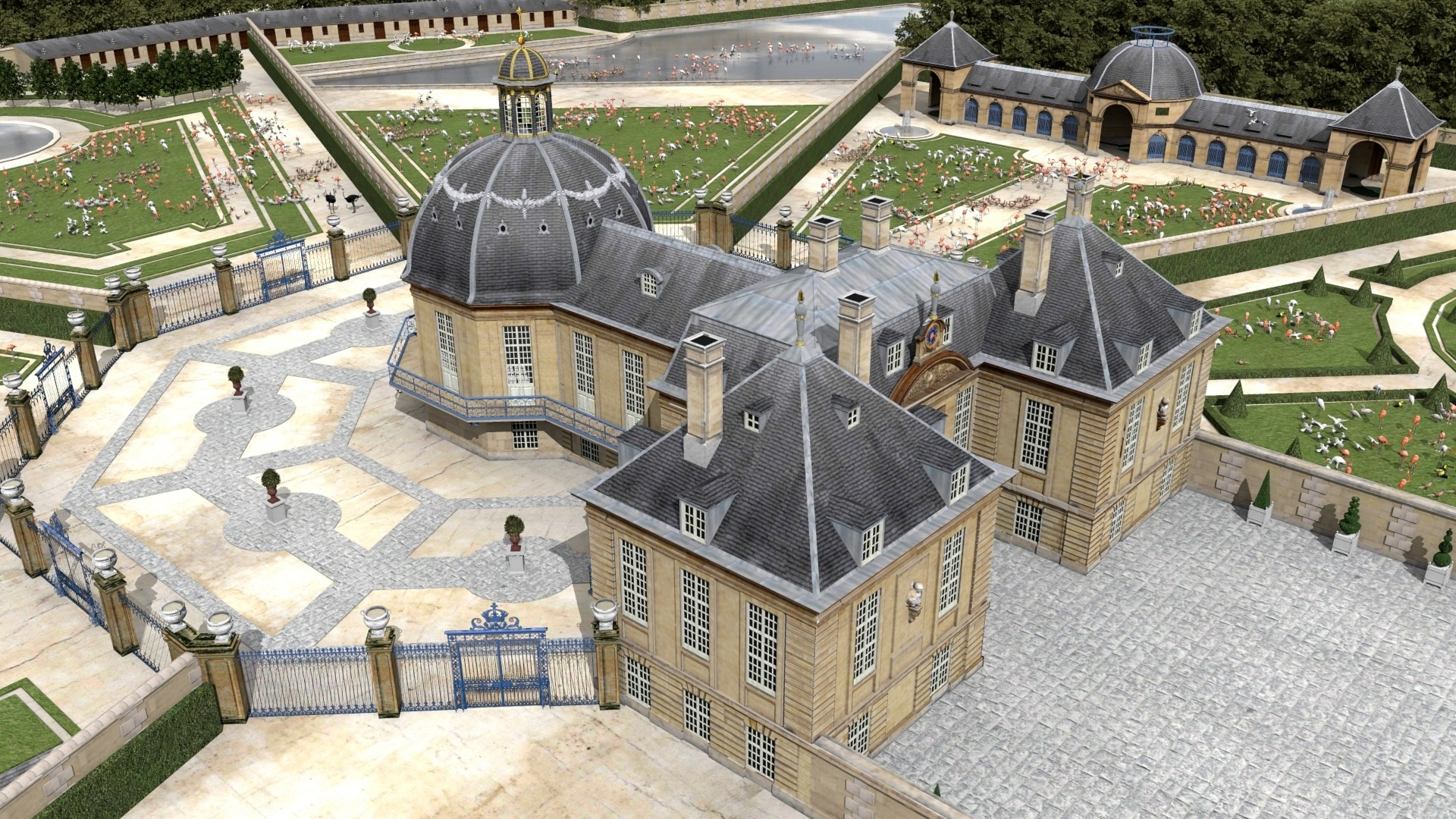
Restoration of the Menagerie at Versailles.

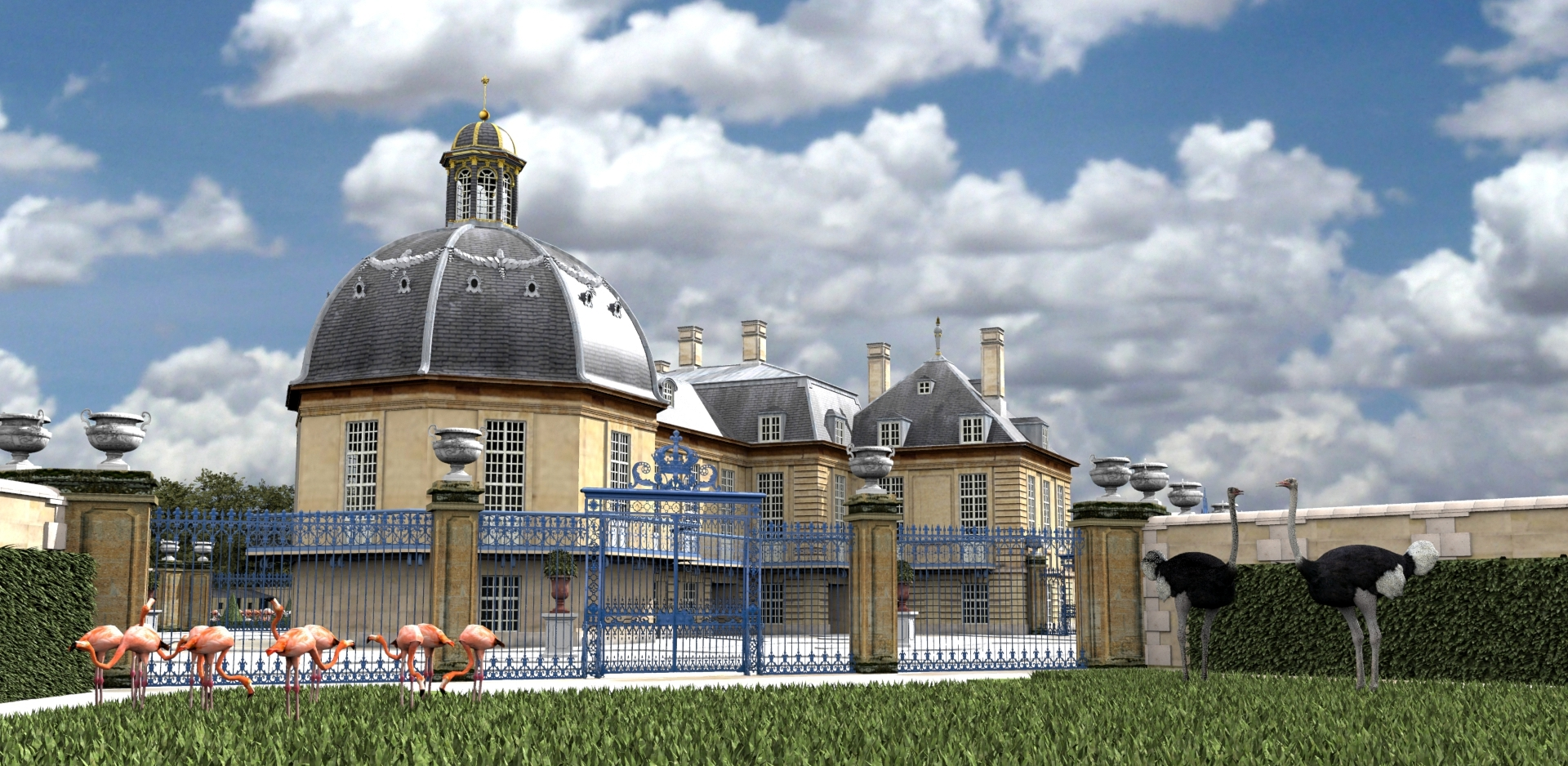
Restoration of the Menagerie at Versailles.

== Decadence and disappearance ==
The menagerie was neglected during the Régence (literal French of "Regency"), and in 1722 an elephant and a few wild animals were brought in to entertain the young Louis XV, to whom the Count of Maurepas gave a lion cub and a tiger.

The young king abandoned the menagerie - he only visited it once - to have his own experimental menagerie built. Maintenance was neglected and the architect Gabriel noted its deterioration as early as 1751. The animals were living almost freely in ruined buildings when Louis XVI decided to transfer the remaining animals to the Jardin des Plantes in Paris. With the Revolution, most of the animals were eaten or sold, and only five survived in 1793. Sieyès took over the estate in 1800. The last animals were transferred from the ruined menagerie to the National Museum of Natural History, where Louis XV's preserved rhinoceros is kept.

The menagerie no longer exists, although a few traces of it can still be seen on aerial photographs, along with a Sentry box and an outbuilding near the Pavillon de la Lanterne.

== The first zoo of modern times ==
Although the tradition of keeping a collection of exotic animals close to the sovereign had been known since Antiquity, the collection created by Louis XIV at Versailles offered a resolutely new model that was adopted throughout Europe. The first innovation was to bring together in one place, on a permanent rather than itinerant basis, the animals scattered around the enclosures of other royal residences. In addition, the Royal Menagerie was the first to classify species, each of which was divided into specially adapted courtyards. Lastly, the real scenography developed by Le Vau, with its radial plan and the radiance of the courtyards from an elevated observation point, was widely imitated, notably in 1752 by Emperor Francis I of Habsburg for his famous Schönbrunn Zoo in Vienna (Austria).

The Palace of Versailles was also teeming with animal life: there were dozens of pets in the princes' flats and in the King's antechamber with its kennels: braques, spaniels, pugs, vervet monkeys, angora cats, macaws, and parakeets. The menagerie was home to a multitude of rare animals: coati, quagga, cassowaries, and crowned cranes, nicknamed the "royal bird"; game abounded in the small and large parks; 700 horses were housed in the stables and 300 hunting dogs in the large kennels.

== In popular culture ==
Sofia Coppola's film Marie Antoinette (2006) contains a humorous scene set at the Menagerie, where Louis XVI (Jason Schwartzman) and Joseph II (Danny Huston) discuss elephants.

== See also ==
- Louis XIV's elephant

== Bibliography ==
=== Historic Studies ===
- Gérard Mabille, Joan Pieragnoli (2010). La Ménagerie de Versailles. Éditions Honoré Clair.
- Joan Pieragnoli (2010). "La Ménagerie de Versailles, fonctionnement d'un domaine complexe". Versalia (13): 173–195.
- Joan Pieragnoli (2014). "La duchesse de Bourgogne et la Ménagerie de Versailles". Marie-Adélaïde de Savoie, duchesse de Bourgogne, enfant terrible de Versailles. coll. "Études sur le XVIIIe siècle". 41. Bruxelles: Éditions de l’Université libre de Bruxelles: 139–161.
- Joan Pieragnoli (2015). "Animaux exotiques et Ménagerie de Versailles". Dictionnaire Louis XIV. Paris: Robert Laffont.
- Joan Pieragnoli (2016). "La cour de France et ses animaux, XVIe – XVIIe siècles" (Le nœud gordien ed.). Paris: PUF.
- Jean Nérée Ronfort (2005). "Commandes pour la duchesse de Bourgogne à Versailles et au château de la Ménagerie". Dossiers de l'Art (124): 67–89.
- Hélène Delalex. "Versailles, Ménagerie royale de". Encyclopædia Universalis.
