= Pembient =

Biotech company

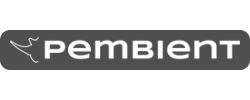
- Industry: Biotechnology
- Founded: January 2015
- Founders: Mathew Markus and George Bonaci
- Headquarters: Seattle, WA, United States
- Area served: Worldwide
- Products: Bioengineered wildlife products (Synthetic rhino horn)
- Website: pembient.com

Pembient is a biotech company in Seattle, Washington, United States that was founded with the goal of creating bioengineered wildlife products to fight poaching around the world.

== History ==
Pembient was founded in January 2015 by Matthew Markus and George Bonaci. Markus and Bonaci discussed the possibility of reverse engineering and bioengineering wildlife products specifically rhino horn. Markus first thought of reverse engineering rhino horn 10 years ago when he read of the severity of the black market poaching industry, 1,200 rhinos were killed in South Africa in 2014, and the western black rhinos were declared extinct by the International Union for Conservation of Nature (IUCN). January 2015, it was announced that Pembient had been admitted to the inaugural class of Indiebio in San Francisco, a three-month business accelerator program awarding $50,000 and mentoring to biotech start-ups using synthetic biology.

In August 2017 Pembient launched its initial coin offering of PembiCoin which is a blockchain-based token that allows its holder to take delivery of one gram of biofabricated horn in the year 2022. As of 2018, the company was continuing their plan to flood the market with synthetic rhino horn to help end poaching.

== Mission ==
The goal of the company is to bioengineer rhino horn and elephant ivory tusks replacement products below the black market price in order to stop the threat to endangered species. One of their current projects is the creation of a synthetic rhino horn using techniques that replicate rhino DNA. Bonaci has stated that even though they are focused on one biochemical product, "Maybe in the future we'll do tissue engineering[or] whatever works for the market."
