= Louis XIV's elephant =

Elephant given to Louis XIV

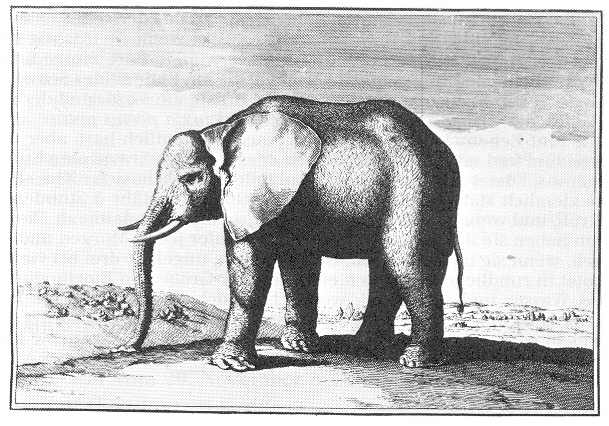
- Species: African elephant
- Sex: Female
- Born: c. 1664
- Died: 1681; Royal Menagerie of Versailles
- Resting place: Royal Menagerie of Versailles
- Owner: Louis XIV

Louis XIV's elephant (born around 1664 and died in 1681 at the Château de Versailles) was a gift from the King of Portugal to Louis XIV, King of France.

== Life ==
A diplomatic gift from Portugal in 1668, this elephant was a female from the Congo. (Note: It is not known whether Alfonso VI or his successor Regent Pedro II was in power when the elephant was shipped to Versailles.) The elephant, housed in the Royal Menagerie of Versailles, died 13 years later in 1681. It is known that she was fed daily with 80 pounds of bread, 12 litres of wine, a large portion of vegetable soup with bread and rice, and grass at will. In the last year of her life, she suffered muscle loss and had to be lifted onto her feet with a crane.

After her death in 1681, the elephant was dissected by Claude Perrault. The results of the analysis were not published until 1734.

The skeleton is now on display at the National Museum of Natural History, France, in the Galerie d'Anatomie comparée.
