= Petite Venise =

The Petite Venise are the group of buildings, which no longer exists today, built under the reign of Louis XIV in the park of the Palace of Versailles and intended to house the accommodation and the construction site of all the personnel contributing to the manoeuvre, maintenance or construction of the Royal Flotilla sailing on the Grand Canal.

A set of buildings located at the eastern end of the Grand Canal, near the Apollo basin, halfway between Trianon and the Palace of Versailles, was therefore built to the standards of military architecture of the time with a closed rectangular shape with a central interior courtyard divided into different activity areas, housing, storage workshops.

The name Petite Venise came to it after the gift of four gondolas with their Venetian gondoliers made by the Doge of Venice to the king.

In addition to gondolas and rowboats, boats typical of French regions or foreign countries were manufactured in their place of origin, dismantled and then transported to Versailles, where they were reassembled in Petite Venise. Sailors, carpenters or caulkers therefore worked on a varied fleet of rowboats, gondolas, up to larger ships like a galley or a galiote.
