= Bassin d'Apollon =

Fountain at the Palace of Versailles, France

Coordinates: 48.8073°N 2.1107°E

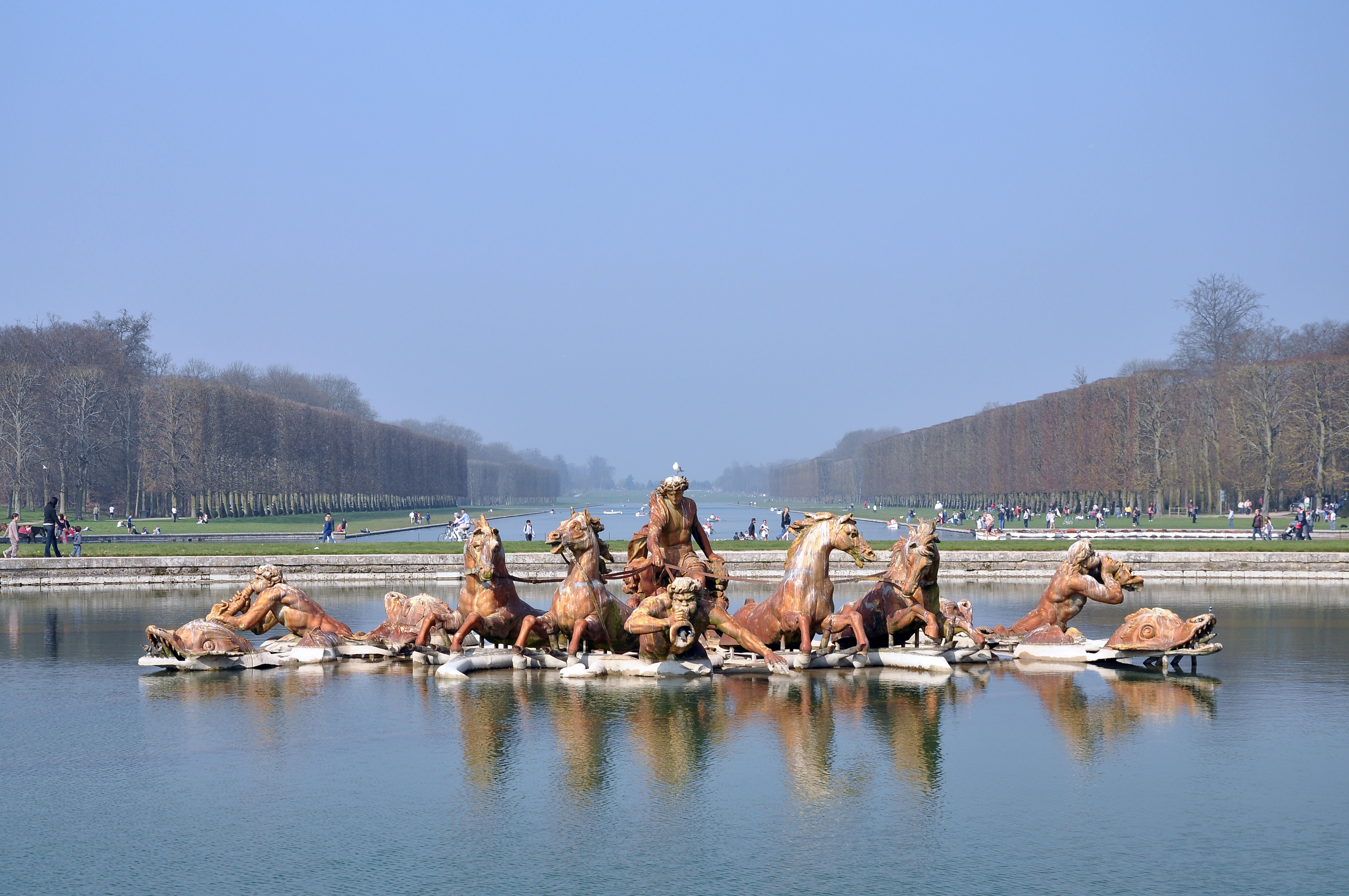
Bassin d'Apollon

Le Bassin d'Apollon (The Apollo Basin), also called the Fountain of Apollo or the Apollo Fountain, is a fountain in the Gardens of the Palace of Versailles, France. Charles Le Brun designed the centerpiece depicting the Greek god Apollo rising from the sea in a four-horse chariot. A pond was dug on the site of the fountain in 1639 called "The Pond of the Swans". When King Louis XIV had it enlarged in 1671, the pond's east–west orientation and the common association of the King with Apollo prompted Le Brun to suggest dedicating the site to Apollo. The dawn theme was popular at the time and appears on some painted ceilings in European palaces. The fountain was constructed between 1668 and 1671.

== Replica in Taiwan ==
In 2014, a full-scale marble replica was installed at the Chimei Museum Tainan, Taiwan. The museum commissioned the French artist Gilles Perrault in 2008 to reproduce the Fountain. It took three years to create a plaster cast, using laser measurements, and another three years to carve the marbles in Carrara, Italy.
