= Rhinoceros of Versailles =

Rhinoceros in the Palace of Versailles menagerie 1770–93

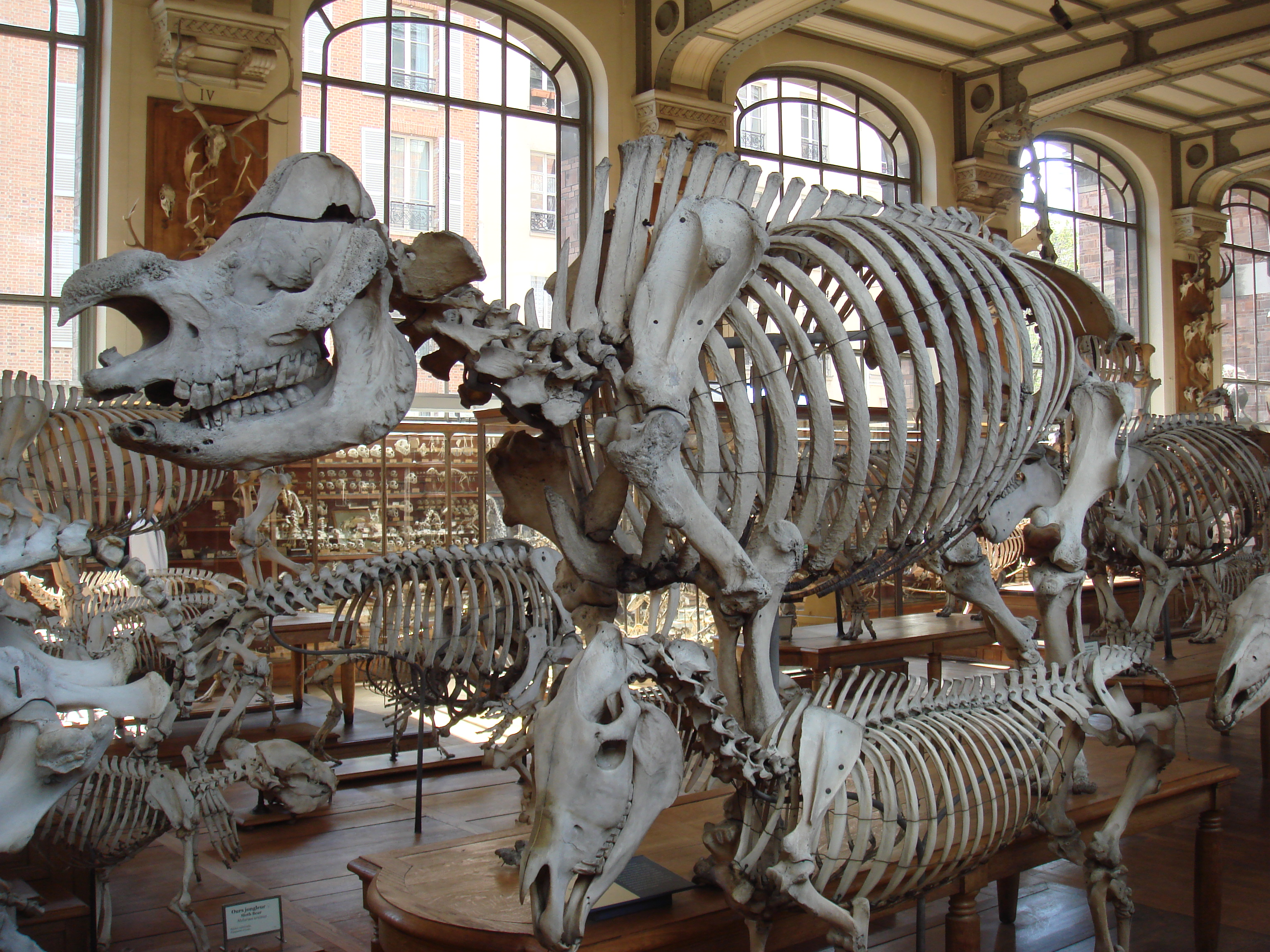
The "rhinoceros of Versailles"

The Rhinoceros of Versailles was a living Indian rhinoceros which was kept in the Palace of Versailles menagerie from 1770 until 1793.

== History ==
The rhinoceros was a gift from M. Chevalier, French governor of Chandernagor, to Louis XV. It left Calcutta, West Bengal on 22 December 1769, and arrived six months later in the seaport of Lorient, in Brittany on 11 June 1770. From there it was transported to the royal Ménagerie which had been built in response to increasing interest in zoology and Louis XIV's passion for the exotic, in 1664.

== Preservation ==
The rhino was installed in a small pen at the Ménagerie of Versailles. When the rhinoceros died in 1793, having been in captivity in France for more than 20 years, its skeleton and hide were preserved. They are today displayed at the Museum d'Histoire Naturelle in Paris.
