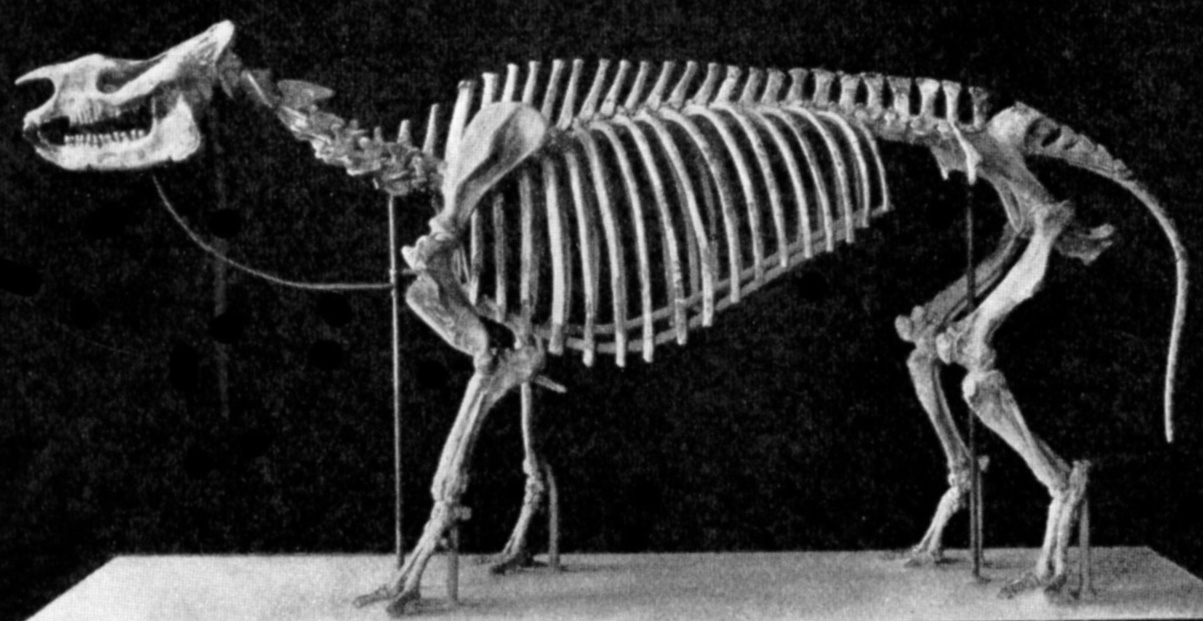
- Subhyracodon occidentalis skeleton

Scientific classification
- Kingdom: Animalia
- Phylum: Chordata
- Class: Mammalia
- Order: Perissodactyla
- Family: Rhinocerotidae
- Genus: †Subhyracodon; Brandt, 1878

Type species
- Subhyracodon occidentalis

Species
- †S. kewi; †S. mitis; †S. occidentalis

Synonyms
- †Anchirodon Forbes, 1881; †Anchisodon Cope, 1879; †Caenopus Cope, 1880; †Leptaceratherium Osborn, 1898

= Subhyracodon =

Subhyracodon Temporal range: Late Eocene to Late Oligocene, 38.0–26.3 Ma

Extinct genus of mammal

Subhyracodon (Latin: "below the genus Hyracodon") is an extinct genus of hornless rhinocerotids.

== Description ==
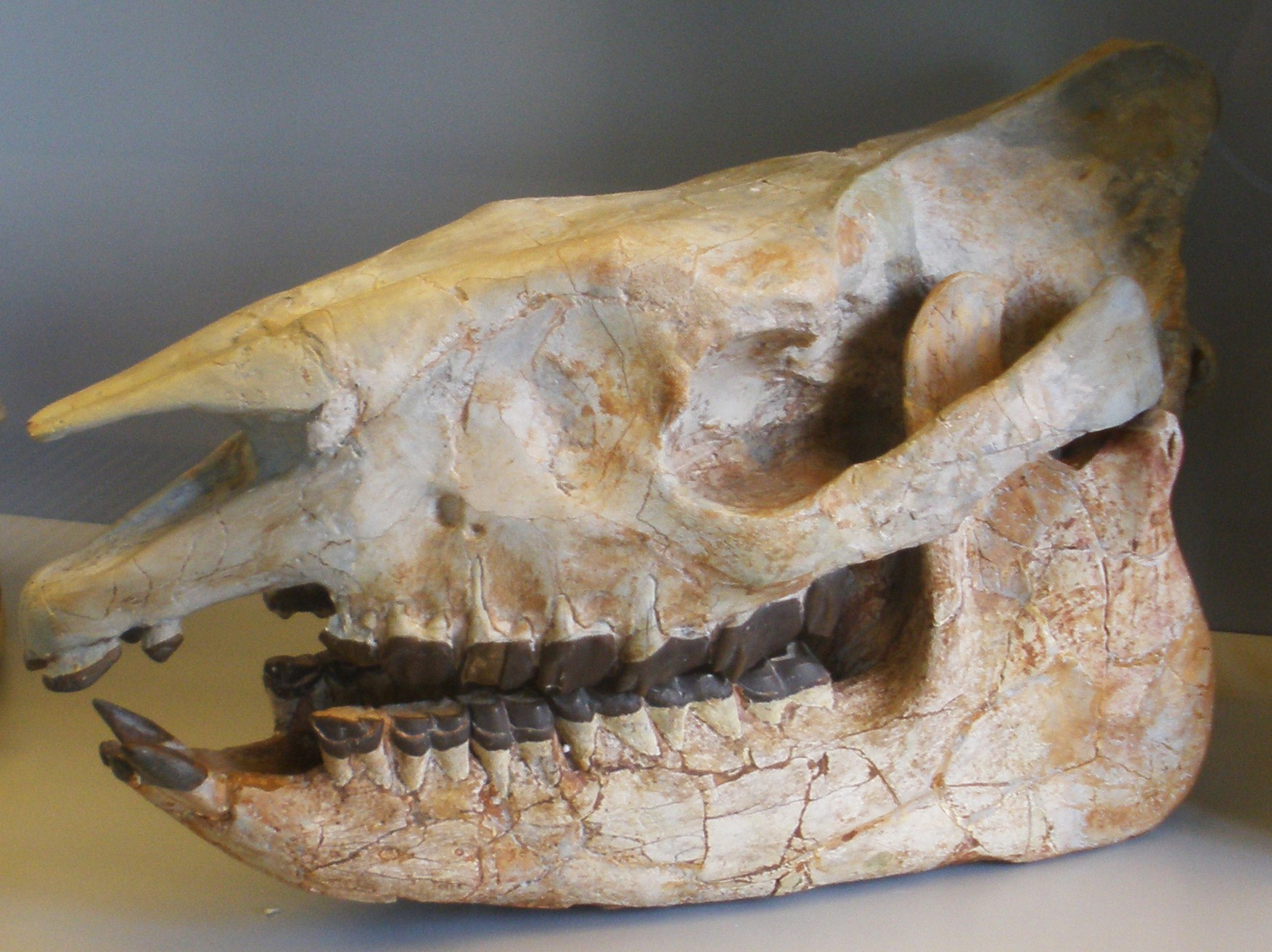
Skull

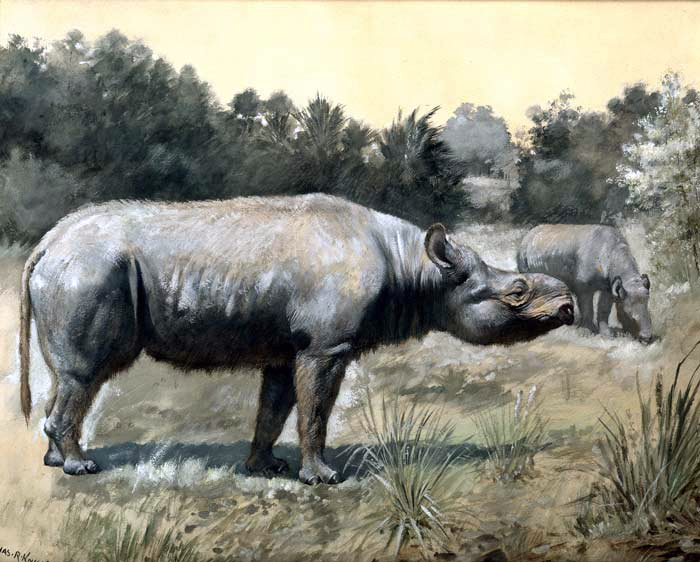
Life restoration by Charles R. Knight

With a length of 2.4 m (7 ft 10 in) and an estimated weight of 381 kg (840 lb) in S. mitis, it was a tapir-sized herbivore on the plains of early Oligocene South Dakota 33 million years ago. It coexisted with other perissodactyls such as horses, brontotheres, and chalicotheres. Subhyracodon had no horns, relying more on its speed to escape from predators, but a species found at Wind Cave National Park had a pair of bony nasal ridges. The genus Caenopus and species originally referred to as Aceratherium were synonymized into Subhyracodon. It has been suggested to be one of the oldest known members of the subfamily Elasmotheriinae by some studies, though other studies place it firmly outside the Rhinocerotinae-Elasmotheriinae split, with a 2025 study placing it as one of the most basal rhinoceroses. In terms of dentition, Subhyracodon was similar to other White River rhinoceroses, bearing no canines or third incisors. The incisor formula of Subhyracodon is 22.

== Classification ==
Cladogram after Borrani et al. 2025:

- Rhinocerotidae
  - - Subhyracodon
    - Trigonias
  - - Teletaceras
    - - Epiaceratherium bolcense + E.naduongense
      - - - Pleuroceros + Plesiaceratherium platyodon
          - - Ronzotherium
            - - Molassitherium
              - Epiaceratherium delemontense + E. magnum
        - - - Mesaceratherium
            - - Diceratherium
              - Menoceras
          - - Protaceratherium
            - Aceratheriinae + Teleoceratinae (equivalent to traditional Aceratheriinae)
            - - Rhinocerotinae (modern rhinoceroses)
              - Elasmotheriinae
