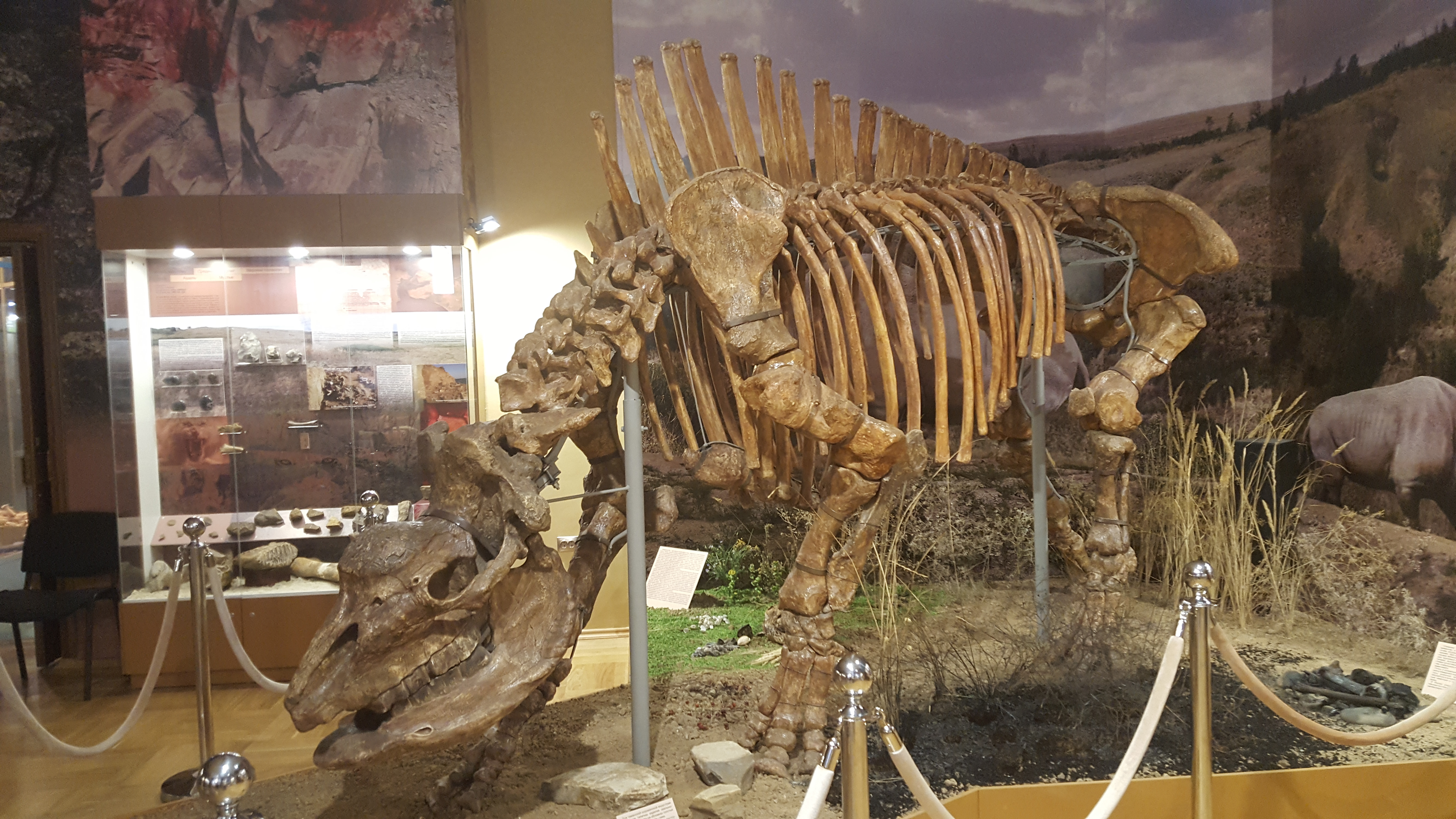
- Skeleton of Elasmotherium

Scientific classification
- Kingdom: Animalia
- Phylum: Chordata
- Class: Mammalia
- Order: Perissodactyla
- Family: Rhinocerotidae
- Subfamily: †Elasmotheriinae; Bonaparte, 1845

Genera
- †Gulfoceras?; †Penetrigonias?; †Subhyracodon?; †Menoceras?; †Diceratherium?; Elasmotheriina; †Bugtirhinus; †Caementodon; †Elasmotherium; †Eoazara; †Hispanotherium; †Iranotherium; †Victoriaceros; †Kenyatherium; †Samburuceros; †Ningxiatherium; †Ougandatherium; †Parelasmotherium; †Procoelodonta; †Sinotherium

= Elasmotheriinae =

Elasmotheriinae Temporal range: Early Miocene–Late Pleistocene Possible Oligocene and Eocene records

Extinct subfamily of rhinoceroses

Elasmotheriinae is an extinct subfamily of true rhinoceroses (Rhinocerotidae) that roamed across Afro-Eurasia and possibly North America from the Early Miocene (or possibly as early as the Eocene, depending on what taxa are included) to the Late Pleistocene. It is best known from the youngest member of the group, Elasmotherium, one of the largest true rhinoceroses, which survived until at least 39,000 years ago in eastern Europe and Central Asia.

== Taxonomy and evolution ==
When Elasmotherium was first described from fragmentary remains in 1808 by Gotthelf Fischer von Waldheim, there was much debate about its affinities, with some authors even proposing that it represented a kind of marine mammal. The first author to recognise that it represented a kind of rhinoceros was Johann Jakob Kaup in 1840-41. The subfamily was first erected as the group Elasmotherina by Charles Lucien Bonaparte in 1845, who agreed with Kaup's view that Elasmotherium was a rhinoceros. Following the finding of a complete skull of Elasmotherium which was described by Johann Friedrich von Brandt in 1877, the rhinoceros affinities of Elasmotherium were widely accepted. It wasn't until the early 20th century that other genera of elasmotheriines would be described or previously described species be recognised as belonging to the group. Historically, the subfamily has sometimes been treated as a separate family from Rhinocerotidae, as Elasmotheriidae (Kretzoi, 1943), or has been treated as the tribe Elasmotheriini within the subfamily Rhinocerotinae (e.g. Heissig 1973, 1989, 1999, and Fortelius & Heissig, 1989 and still adopted by some modern authors e.g.), the subtribe Elasomotheriina within the tribe Rhinocerotini (Prothero & Schoch, 1989 and Cerdeño 1995) or even the infratribe Elasmotherii within the subtribe Rhinocerotina (McKenna & Bell, 1997) The subfamily Iranotheriinae or subtribe Iranotheriina was also sometimes historically considered separate from Elasmotheriinae (or its various equivalents), following Kretzoi, 1943.

It is disputed whether some primitive Eocene-Miocene North American rhinoceroses like Subhyracodon, Diceratherium, and Menoceras are primitive members of Elasmotheriinae, or whether they fall elsewhere in the rhinoceros family tree. The relationships between the three major subfamilies of Rhinocerotidae, Rhinocerotinae (which includes modern rhinoceroses), Aceratheriinae (which contains a high diversity of largely hornless rhinoceroses) and Elasmotheriinae is disputed, with some studies suggesting that Rhinocerotinae and Elasmotheriinae are more closely related to each other than to Aceratheriinae, while others contend that Rhinocerotinae is more closely related to Aceratheriinae than to Elasmotheriinae.

The timing of the divergence of Elasmotheriinae from the ancestors of living rhinoceroses is disputed. A 2019 study suggested that Elasmotheriinae diverged from the ancestors of living rhinoceroses around 47 million years ago, during the Eocene. However this conclusion of this study was later doubted as it was based on assuming that the early rhinoceros Epiaceratherium was more closely related to living rhinoceroses than to Elasmotheriinae, which later research brought into question. A 2025 study suggested a later divergence, during the Oligocene-earliest Miocene, around 34-22 million years ago. In modern taxonomic schemes, the core, unambiguous Afro-Eurasian members of the subfamily are assigned to the clade Elasmotheriina within Elasmotheriinae.

The earliest member of Elasmotheriina, Bugtirhinus, is known from earliest Miocene aged Bugti Hills of South Asia, with members of Elasmotheriina subsequently dispersing to Western Europe and Africa by the end of the Early Miocene. During the Miocene, Elasmotheriina was highly diverse, however only two genera survived into the Pliocene, the closely related Sinotherium (which became extinct in the early Pliocene) and Elasmotherium, the latter the only genus to persist into the Pleistocene. The last species of Elasmotherium, E. sibircum became extinct near the end of the Pleistocene during the Last Glacial Period, surviving at least as recently as 39,000 years ago in Eastern Europe and Central Asia.

Cladogram of Rhinocerotidae after Borrani et al. 2025

- Rhinocerotidae
  - - Subhyracodon
    - Trigonias
  - - Teletaceras
    - - Epiaceratherium bolcense + E.naduongense
      - - - Pleuroceros + Plesiaceratherium platyodon
          - - Ronzotherium
            - - Molassitherium
              - Epiaceratherium delemontense + E. magnum
        - - - Mesaceratherium
            - - Diceratherium
              - Menoceras
          - - Protaceratherium
            - Aceratheriinae + Teleoceratinae (equivalent to traditional Aceratheriinae)
            - - Rhinocerotinae (modern rhinoceroses)
              - Elasmotheriinae
                - Bugtirhinus + Hispanotherium
                - - Parelasmotherium
                  - - Iranotherium
                    - - Ningxiatherium
                      - - Sinotherium
                        - Elasmotherium

Cladogram of Elasmotheriinae after Geraads and Zouhri, 2021:

- - Elasmotheriinae
    - Rusingaceros leakeyi
    - Brachypotherium minor
    - - Turkanatherium acutirostratum
      - - - Chilotheridium pattersoni
          - Victoriaceros kenyensis
        - - Caementodon caucasicum
          - - Hispanotherium beonense
            - Hispanotherium matritense
            - - Begertherium grimmi
              - - "Hispanotherium" tungurense
                - - Iranotherium morgani
                  - - Eoazara xerrii
                    - - Parelasmotherium lingxiaense
                      - - Ningxiatherium euryrhinus
                        - - Ningxiatherium longirhinus
                          - Elasmotherium sibiricum

Cladogram of Elasmotheriina after Sun et al. 2023:

- Elasmotheriina
  - Kenyatherium
  - - Bugtirhinus
    - - Caementodon
      - - - Ougandatherium
          - - Samburuceros
            - Victoriaceros
        - - Hispanotherium matritense
          - - Hispanotherium tungurense
            - - Procoelodonta
              - - Tongxinotherium
                - - Iranotherium
                  - - Eoazara
                    - - Ningxiatherium
                      - - Parelasmotherium
                        - - Sinotherium
                          - Elasmotherium

== Description ==
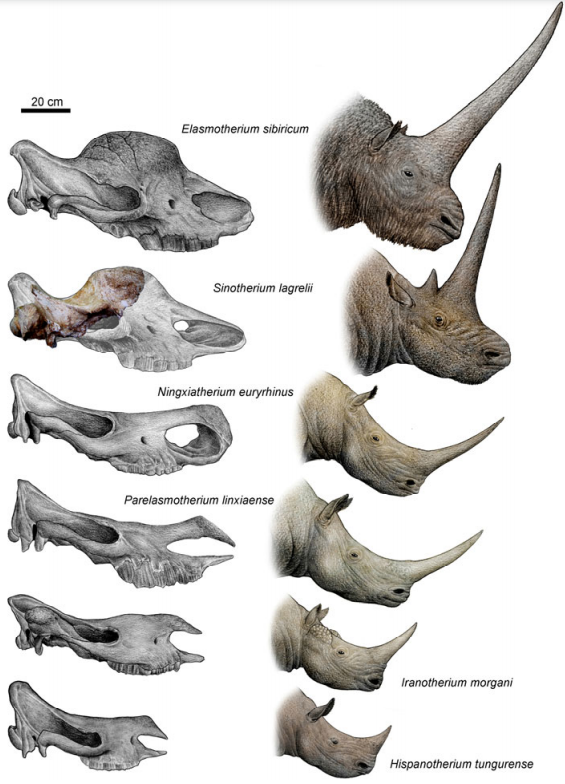
Skulls and head restorations of various members of Elasmotheriina, including from bottom to top, Hispanotherium, Iranotherium, Parelasmotherium, Ningxiatherium Sinotherium and Elasmotherium , following traditional interpretation of Elasmotherium with a large horn

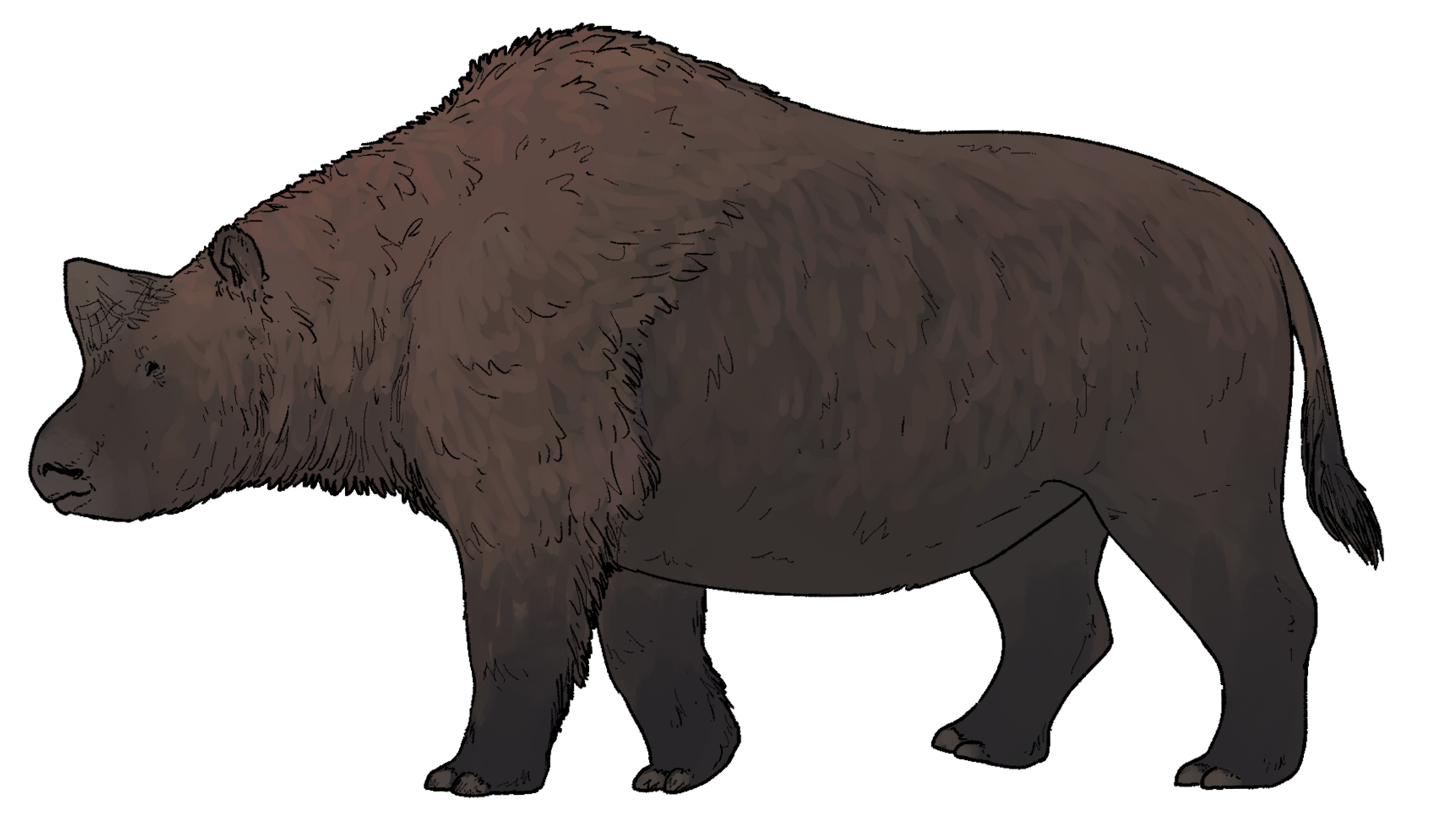
Life restoration of Elasmotherium sibiricum with small keratinous covering of the dome following the interpretation of Titov et al. 2021

Members of Elasmotheriina have relatively slender (proportionally thin) limb bones, that were adapted to moving in open environments. The earliest known member of Elasmotheriina, Bugtirhinus, was about the size of the living Malayan tapir, while the youngest known member of the subfamily, Elasmotherium sibiricum has an estimated body-mass of 4,500 kilograms (9,900 lb), considerably exceeding living rhinoceroses in size. The teeth of members of Elasmotheriina are high crowned (hypsodont), with the molar row being elongated and the teeth developing complex occlusal patterns (interlocking patterns of the upper and lower teeth). In the Elasmotherium lineage, the molar teeth became evergrowing (hypselodont) like the teeth of some rodents. Some later forms also show the loss of incisor teeth.

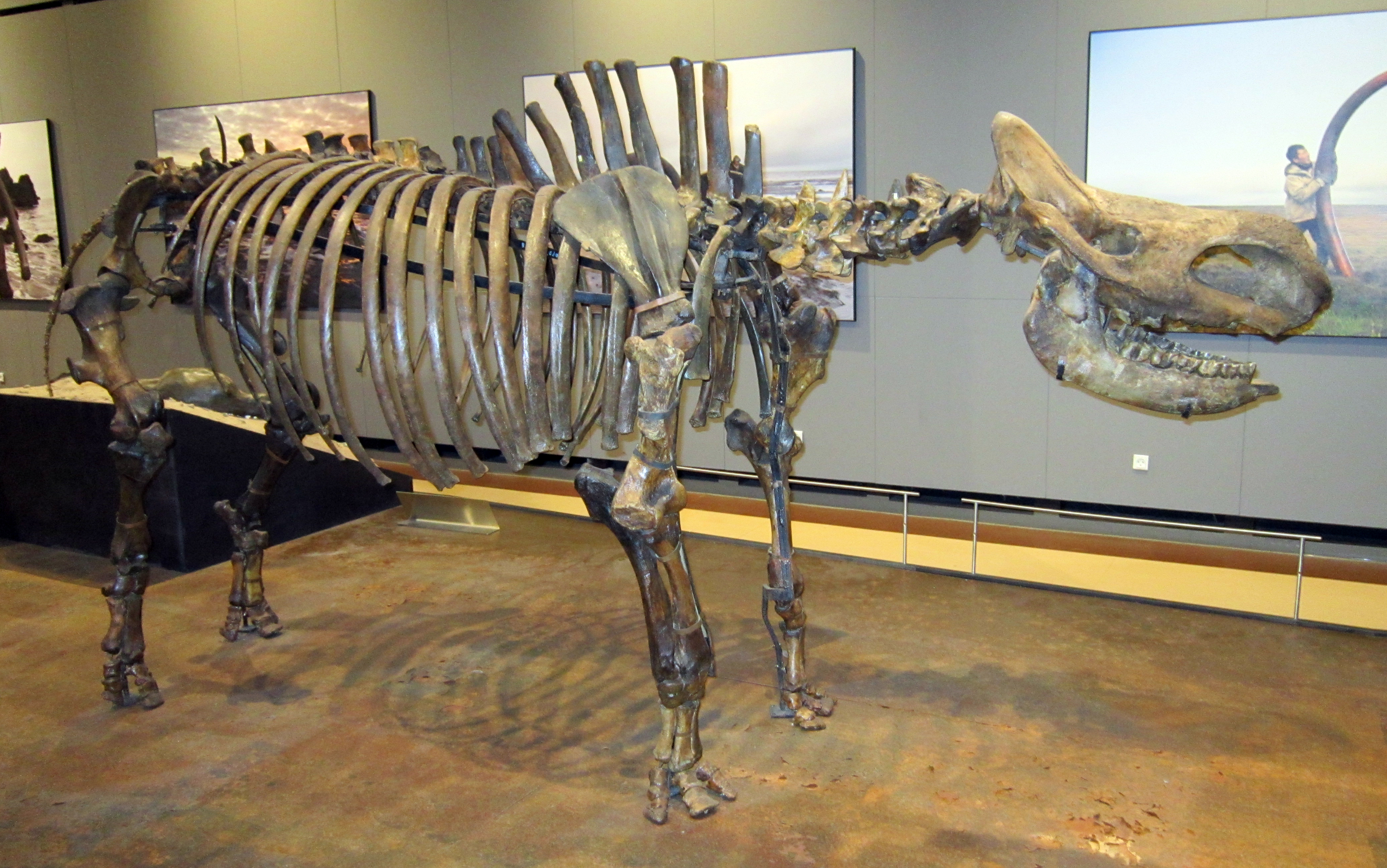
Skeleton of Caementodon

While early members had a non-bony nasal septum, in some later members the nasal septum ossified, having turned into bone. Although some primitive members of Elasmotheriina like Ougandatherium were hornless, many members of Elasmotheriina are suggested to have borne a nasal horn at the front of the snout, which is proposed to have been small and perhaps variably present depending on sex in early members and larger in later ones. It has alternatively been proposed that all members of Elasmotheriinae were hornless, due to like other non-rhinocerotine rhinocerotids lacking the ring-shaped rugose bone marks found on modern rhinoceros skulls where the horns attach.

In Sinotherium and Elasmotherium, a large dome/boss developed on top of the skull roof, which is often thought to have been an attachment point for a frontal horn, and a nasal horn appears to have been absent. Elasmotherium is traditionally thought to have had an extremely large and elongated frontal horn, but no preserved horn has ever been found. Titov et al. 2021, concluded that the cranial dome was in fact relatively weak because the dome, which formed an enlargement of the nasal cavity, was largely hollow and had thin outer walls, it and could not have borne a horn as it has been commonly depicted, and was instead covered with a keratinous pad. These researchers reasoned that the large dome may have functioned primarily to enhance the sense of smell, and perhaps secondarily act as a resonating chamber.

== Ecology ==
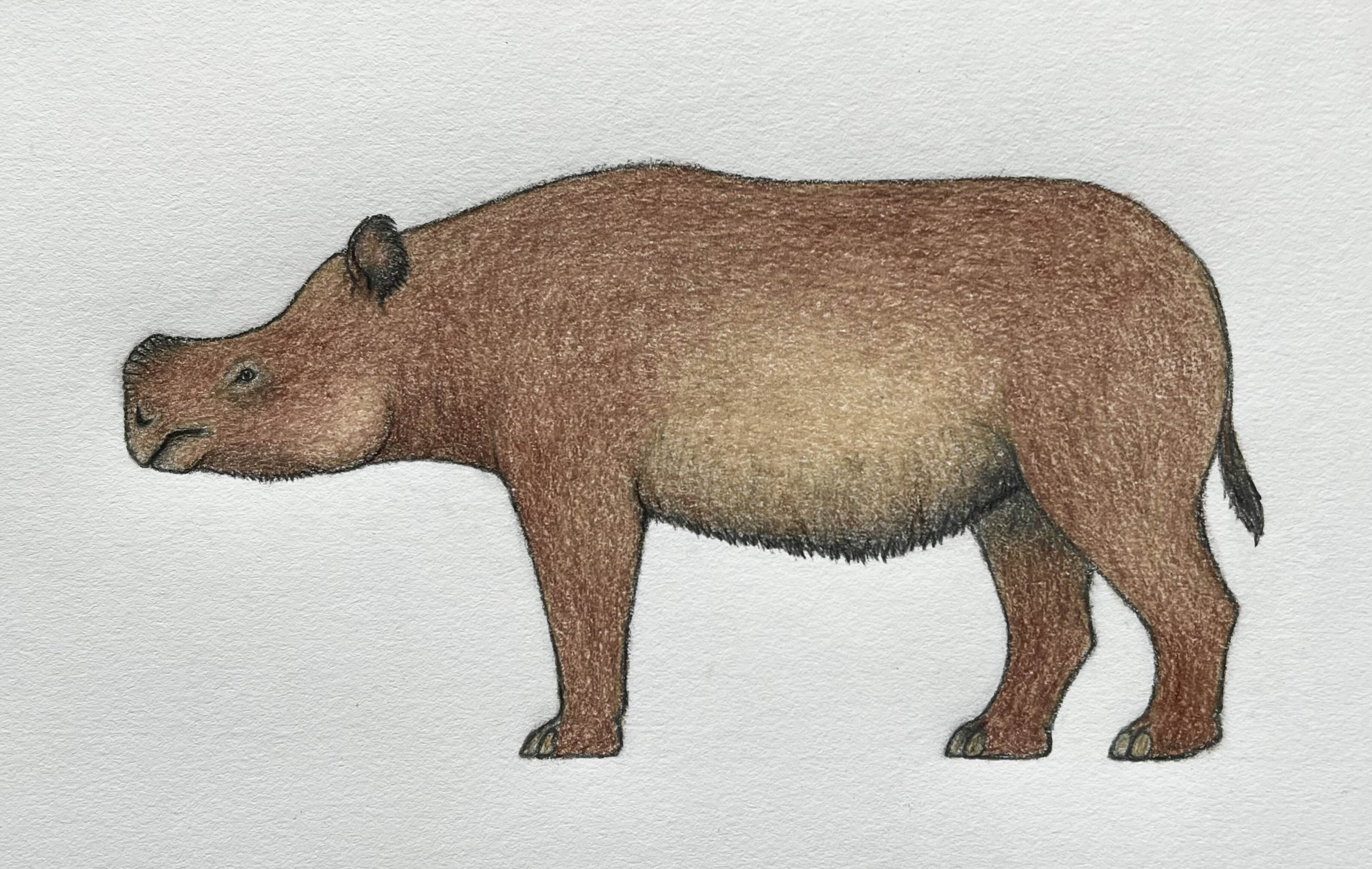
Life restoration of Victoriaceros, a small elasmothere known from the Miocene of Africa

Members of Elasmotheriina are thought to have been adapted for a predominantly grazing-based diet. They are thought to have been cursorial animals that were capable runners. During the Miocene, they were often associated with savanna habitats, while Pleistocene Elasmotherium was associated with steppe environments. Individuals of Iranotherium morgani exhibit strong sexual dimorphism both in size and morphology of the skull, and males are suggested to have engaged in fights against other males.
