= Samburuceros =

Samburuceros Temporal range: Tortonian

Scientific classification
- Kingdom: Animalia
- Phylum: Chordata
- Class: Mammalia
- Infraclass: Placentalia
- Order: Perissodactyla
- Family: Rhinocerotidae
- Subfamily: †Elasmotheriinae
- Genus: †Samburuceros
- Species: †S. ishidai

Binomial name
- †Samburuceros ishidai Handa et al., 2017

Extinct genus of elasmotheriin rhinocerotid

Samburuceros is an extinct monotypic genus of elasmotheriin rhinoceros that lived in East Africa during the Tortonian stage of the Miocene epoch.

== Description ==
Samburuceros ishidai, the type species of the genus, can be distinguished from its closest relative Victoriaceros on the basis of S. ishidai having an enamel ring on the medisinus of M^{2} and M^{3}. S. ishidai also possesses a distinct lingual groove on the protocone of the M^{2} and M^{3}.
