= Shennongtherium =

Shennongtherium Temporal range: Miocene

Scientific classification
- Kingdom: Animalia
- Phylum: Chordata
- Class: Mammalia
- Order: Perissodactyla
- Family: Rhinocerotidae
- Genus: †Shennongtherium; Huang & Yan, 1983
- Species: †S. hypsodontus

Binomial name
- †Shennongtherium hypsodontus Huang & Yan, 1983

Extinct genus of mammal

Shennongtherium is an extinct genus of rhinocerotid from the Miocene time period. It once roamed in what is now China.

It was originally classified in the subfamily Elasmotheriinae, but has since been found to be closer to true rhinoceros.
