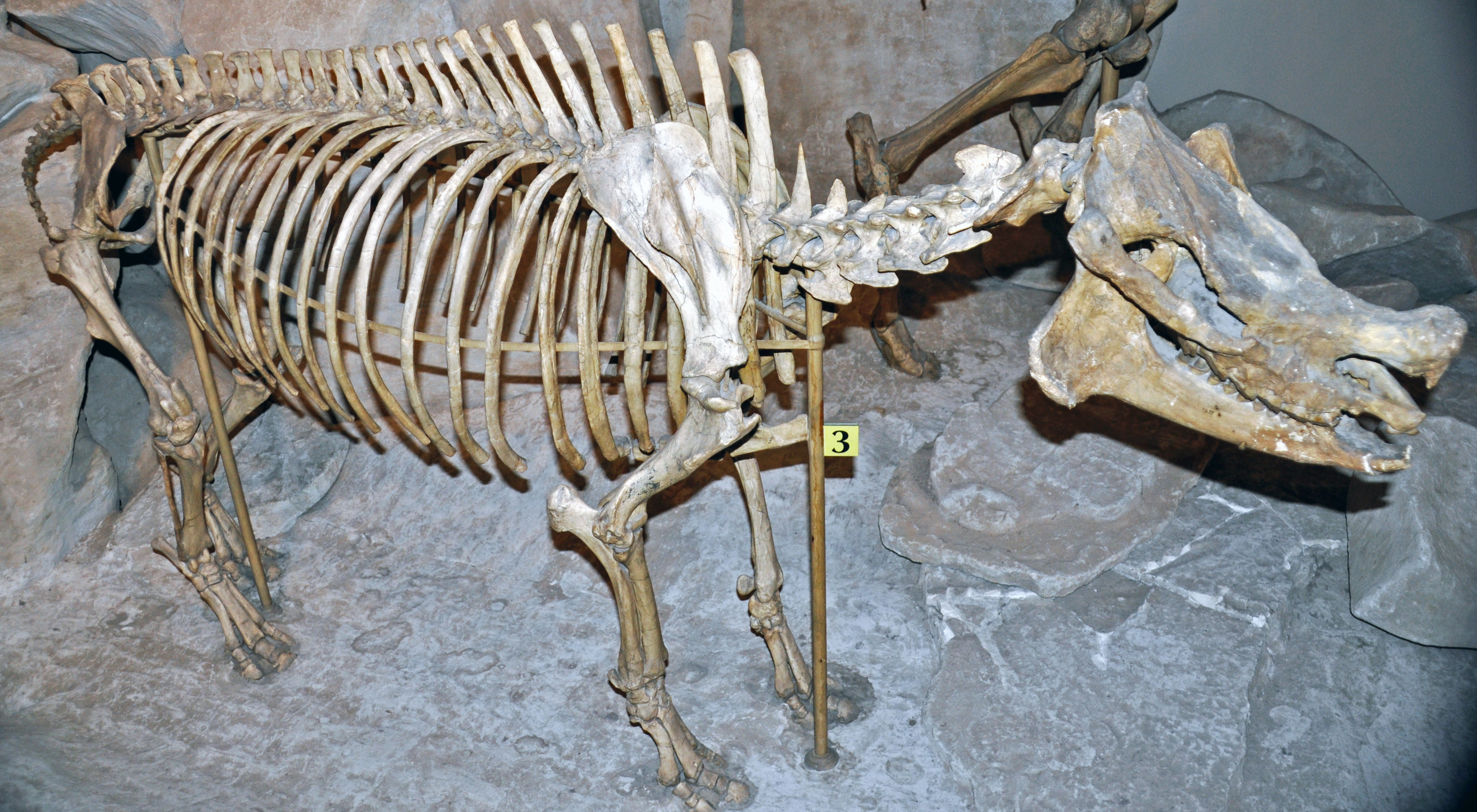
- Mounted M. arikarense skeleton

Scientific classification
- Kingdom: Animalia
- Phylum: Chordata
- Class: Mammalia
- Order: Perissodactyla
- Family: Rhinocerotidae
- Subfamily: †Elasmotheriinae
- Genus: †Menoceras (Troxell, 1921)

Type species
- Menoceras arikarense

Species
- M. arikarense; M. barbouri

Synonyms
- Moschoedestes Stevens, 1969; Diceratherium cooki; Diceratherium arikarense

= Menoceras =

Menoceras Temporal range: early Miocene, 23.1–12.5 Ma

Extinct genus of mammals

Menoceras ("Crescent Horns") is a genus of extinct, small rhinocerotids endemic to most of southern North America and ranged as far south as Panama during the early Miocene epoch. It lived from around 23.1-12.5 Ma, existing for approximately 10.6 million years.

== Description ==
Menoceras was much smaller than any living rhinoceros, with the genus being compared in size to a sheep or a pig, an with estimated bodymass of 313 kilograms (690 lb). Male Menoceras sported two horns side by side at the tip of the nose, whereas the females were hornless or had greatly reduced horns, and have differently shaped nasal bones. Menoceras along with Diceratherium is unique in having paired horns among rhinocerotids. Both sexes of Menoceros grew to a length of 5 feet (1.5 meters) long.

== Paleobiology ==
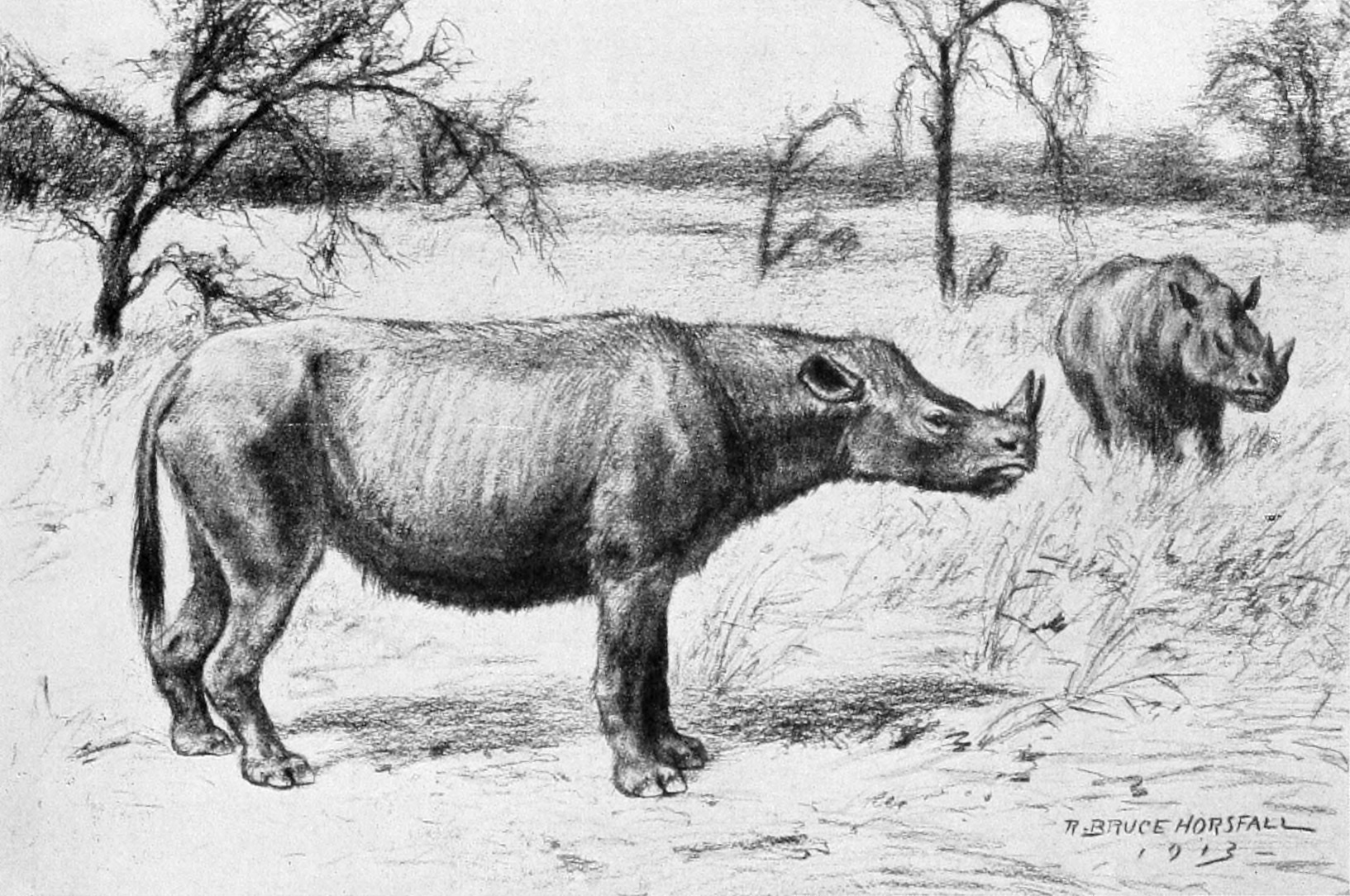
1913 illustration of M. arikarense.

Menoceras roamed across a tropical, savanna-like grassland and plains environment that covered much of North America. Because of the massive accumulations of fossil bones of this animal, particularly at Agate Springs Nebraska, Menoceras may have lived in large herds. Other sites include Martin-Anthony site Martin County, Florida, and Cady Mountains Horse Quarry, San Bernardino County, California.

== Taxonomy ==
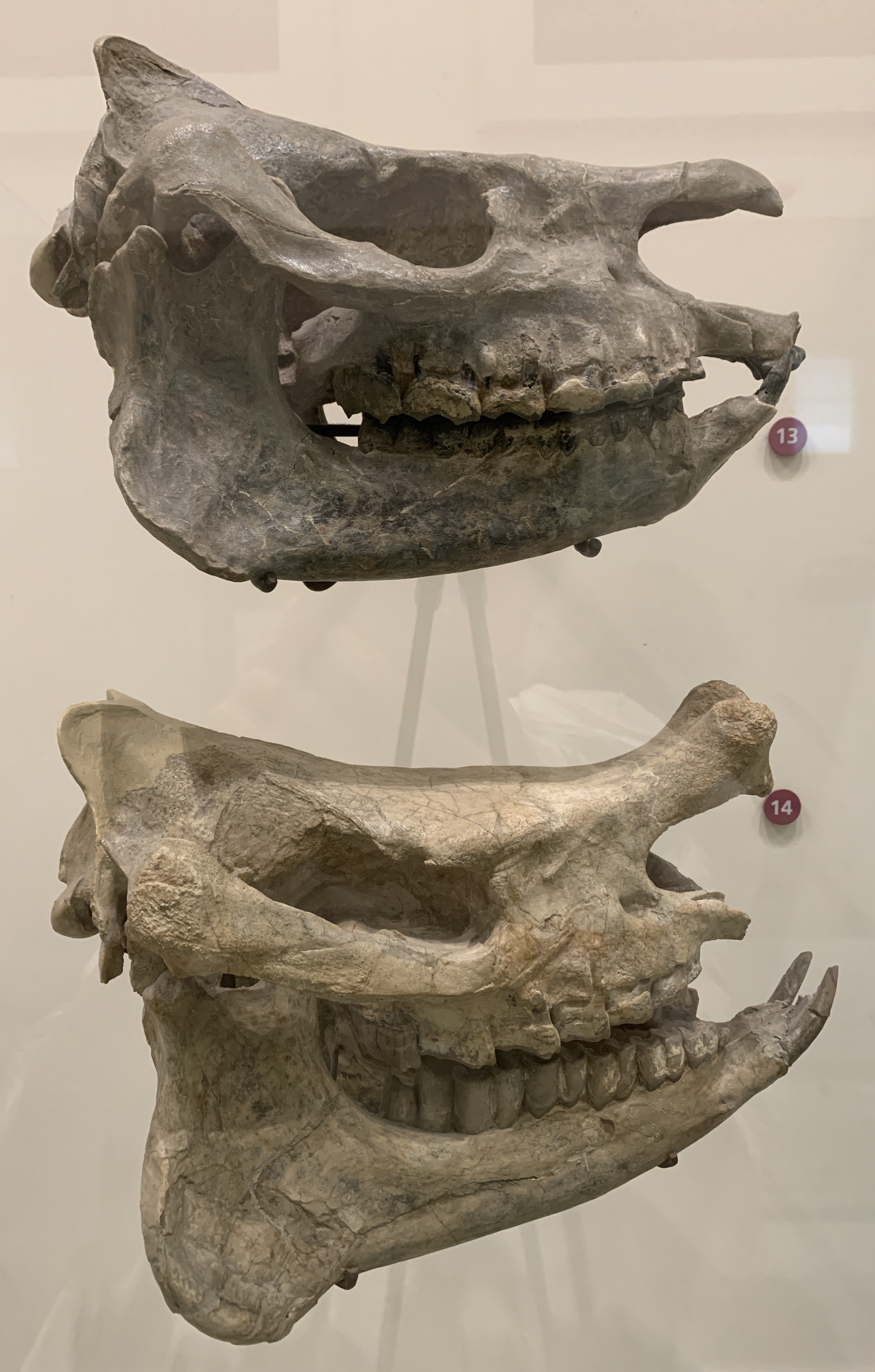
Female (top) and male (bottom) M. arikarense skulls

Menoceras was named by Troxell and assigned to Rhinocerotidae in 1921. It was synonymized subjectively with Diceratherium by Matthew in 1931 and Wood in 1964. Again assigned to Rhinocerotidae by Prothero, Guerrin, Manning in 1989. Tanner (1969), Wilson and Schiebout (1981), Prothero and Manning (1987), Carroll (1988) and Prothero et al. (1989); and to Menoceratinae by Prothero (1998). Although some researchers have considered Menoceras to be an early member/relative of Elasmotheriinae, other studies have placed Menoceras as less closely related to Elasmotheriinae than Elasmotheriinae is to modern rhinoceroses (Rhinocerotinae)

Cladogram of Rhinocerotidae after Borrani et al. 2025

- Rhinocerotidae
  - - Subhyracodon
    - Trigonias
  - - Teletaceras
    - - Epiaceratherium bolcense + E.naduongense
      - - - Pleuroceros + Plesiaceratherium platyodon
          - - Ronzotherium
            - - Molassitherium
              - Epiaceratherium delemontense + E. magnum
        - - - Mesaceratherium
            - - Diceratherium
              - Menoceras
          - - Protaceratherium
            - Aceratheriinae + Teleoceratinae (equivalent to traditional Aceratheriinae)
            - - Rhinocerotinae (modern rhinoceroses)
              - Elasmotheriinae

== Fossil distribution ==
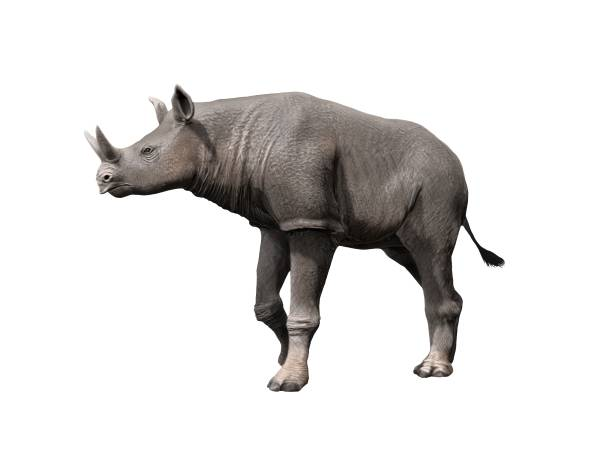
Life reconstruction of M. barbouri

Fossil distribution is as far north as New Jersey, south to Florida (3 collections) and Texas (6 collections), as far west as Nebraska (7 collections) and California (2 collections).

The Panamanian find was determined to be 19.7 Ma (AEO). It was found in the Gaillard Cut in Panama in "a 45 m thick section (narrow stratigraphic interval)" It was reposited in the Smithsonian Institution, Washington, D.C. Other sites:

- Lay Ranch Beds, Goshen County, Wyoming, a deposit of several carnivores and herbivores.
- Agate Springs Quarries, Sioux County, Nebraska, a deposit of Miocene herbivores and carnivores such as Moropus elatus, Cynelos, Cephalogale, and a number of Artiodactyla.
- Martin Canyon Quarry A, Logan County, Colorado, a very substantial number of carnivores and herbivores.
