= Tongxinotherium =

Tongxinotherium Temporal range: Middle Miocene

Scientific classification
- Kingdom: Animalia
- Phylum: Chordata
- Class: Mammalia
- Infraclass: Placentalia
- Order: Perissodactyla
- Family: Rhinocerotidae
- Subfamily: †Elasmotheriinae
- Genus: †Tongxinotherium
- Species: †T. latirhinum

Binomial name
- †Tongxinotherium latirhinum Sun et al., 2023

Extinct genus of rhinocerotid

Tongxinotherium is an extinct genus of rhinocerotid that lived during the Miocene epoch.

== Distribution ==
Tongxinotherium latirhinum is known from fossils found in the Zhang'embao Formation in Ningxia, China.
