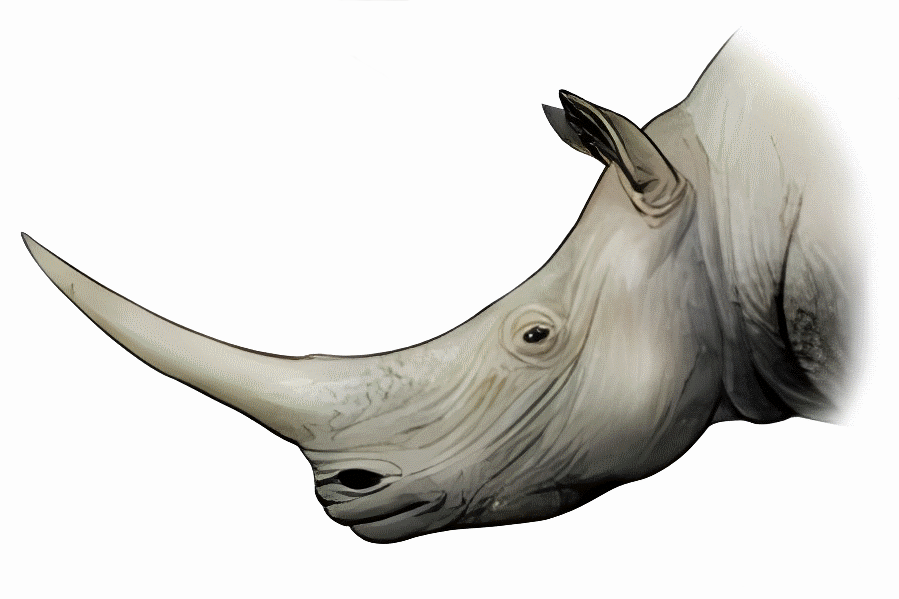
- Parelasmotherium linxiaense head

Scientific classification
- Kingdom: Animalia
- Phylum: Chordata
- Class: Mammalia
- Order: Perissodactyla
- Family: Rhinocerotidae
- Subfamily: †Elasmotheriinae
- Genus: †Parelasmotherium; Killgus, 1923

Type species
- †Parelasmotherium schansiense Killgus, 1923

Other species
- †P. simplum Qui & Xie, 1998; †P. linxiaense Deng, 2001

= Parelasmotherium =

Parelasmotherium Temporal range: Late Miocene

Extinct genus of rhinoceroses

Parelasmotherium is an extinct genus of rhinocerotids that lived in Northern China about 11.1 million years ago in the Late Miocene. With its large body and its hypsodont grazing teeth, it belonged to the subfamily Elasmotheriinae and was a relative of the later Elasmotherium, which was widespread over large parts of northern Asia in the Pleistocene.

It was named in 1923 and was once considered to be a synonym of Sinotherium. Three species of this genus have been named, although analysis of their teeth in 2022 suggested that two of them (P. simplum and P. linxiaense) are not closely related to the remaining species and should be placed in a separate genus.

== History ==
Hugo Killgus established the genus Parelasmotherium in 1923, as a giant elasmotheriine rhinoceros to which he assigned the species Parelasmotherium schansiense based on fossil remains that were collected from Shanxi, China.
