= Bugtirhinus =

Bugtirhinus Temporal range: Early Miocene

Scientific classification
- Kingdom: Animalia
- Phylum: Chordata
- Class: Mammalia
- Infraclass: Placentalia
- Order: Perissodactyla
- Family: Rhinocerotidae
- Subfamily: †Elasmotheriinae
- Genus: †Bugtirhinus; Antoine and Welcomme, 2000
- Species: †B. praecursor

Binomial name
- †Bugtirhinus praecursor Antoine and Welcomme, 2000

Extinct genus of mammal

Bugtirhinus is an extinct genus of rhinocerotid of the subfamily Elasmotheriinae that lived during the Early Mocene in the Bugti Hills of what is now Pakistan. It is the earliest known member of Elasmotheriina.

== Taxonomy ==
Bugtirhinus was named by Antoine and Welcomme (2000). Its type is Bugtirhinus praecursor. It was assigned to Elasmotheriini by Antoine and Welcomme (2000); and to Iranotheriinae by Guérin and Pickford (2003), and to Elasmotheriinae by later publications.

== Description ==
Bugtirhinus was relatively small, around the size of the living Malayan tapir.
