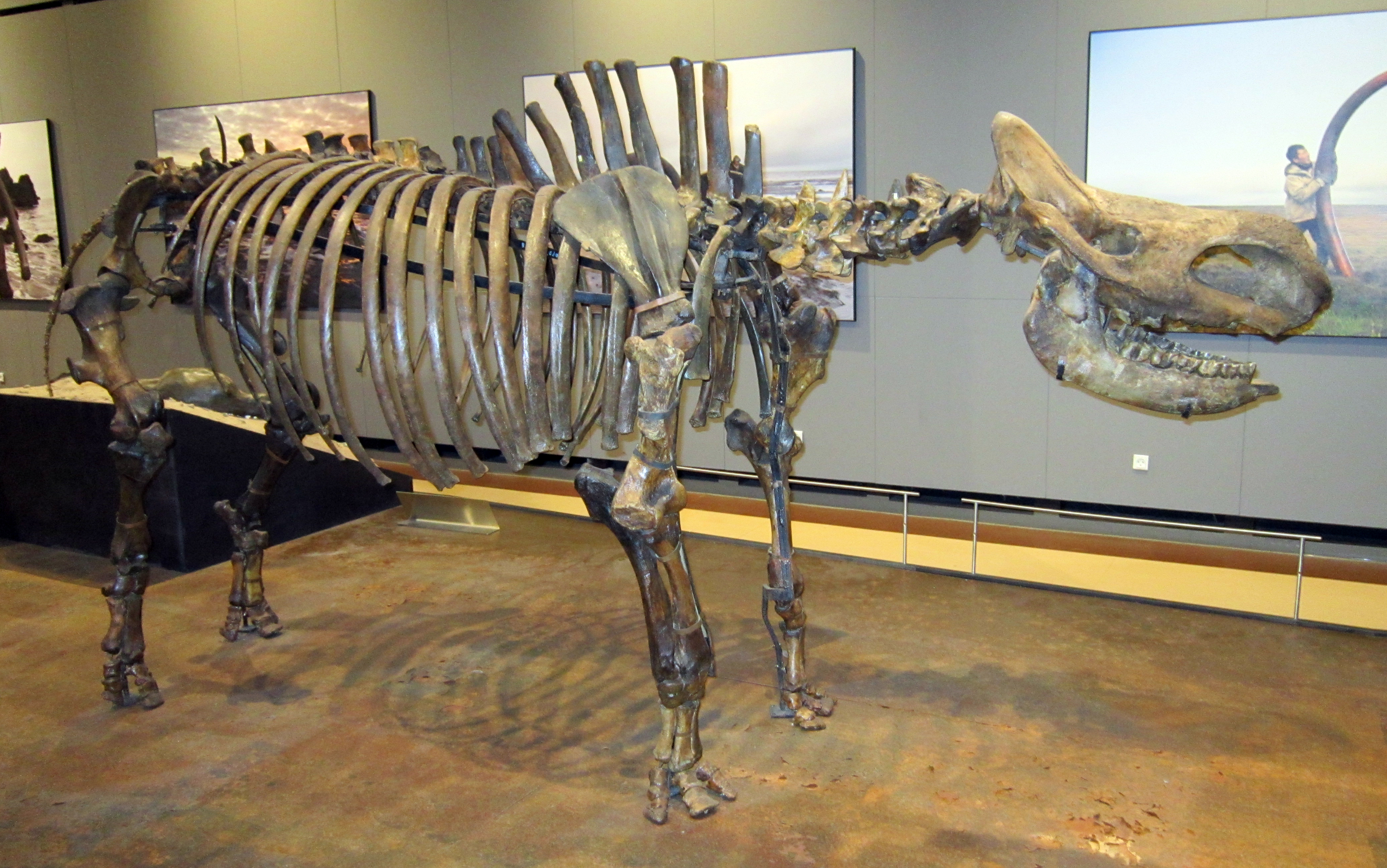
- Caementodon caucasicum skeleton in the Zoological Museum of Copenhagen

Scientific classification
- Domain: Eukaryota
- Kingdom: Animalia
- Phylum: Chordata
- Class: Mammalia
- Order: Perissodactyla
- Family: Rhinocerotidae
- Subfamily: †Elasmotheriinae
- Genus: †Caementodon; Heissig, 1972

Species
- Caementodon caucasicum; Caementodon oettingenae; Caementodon fangxianense

= Caementodon =

Caementodon Temporal range: Middle Miocene–Late Miocene

Extinct genus of mammal

Caementodon is an extinct genus of rhinocerotid of the clade Elasmotheriinae endemic to Europe and Asia during the Miocene.
