= Gulfoceras =

Gulfoceras Temporal range: 23.03–20.4 Ma

Scientific classification
- Domain: Eukaryota
- Kingdom: Animalia
- Phylum: Chordata
- Class: Mammalia
- Order: Perissodactyla
- Family: Rhinocerotidae
- Genus: †Gulfoceras; Albright, 1999
- Species: †G. westfalli

Binomial name
- †Gulfoceras westfalli Albright, 1999

Extinct genus of rhinoceros

Gulfoceras is an extinct genus of rhinocerotids endemic to North America from the Miocene, living from 23.03 to 20.4 mya existing for approximately 2.63 million years.

== Taxonomy ==
Gulfoceras was named by Albright (1999). Its type is Gulfoceras westfalli. It was assigned to Rhinocerotidae by Albright (1999).
