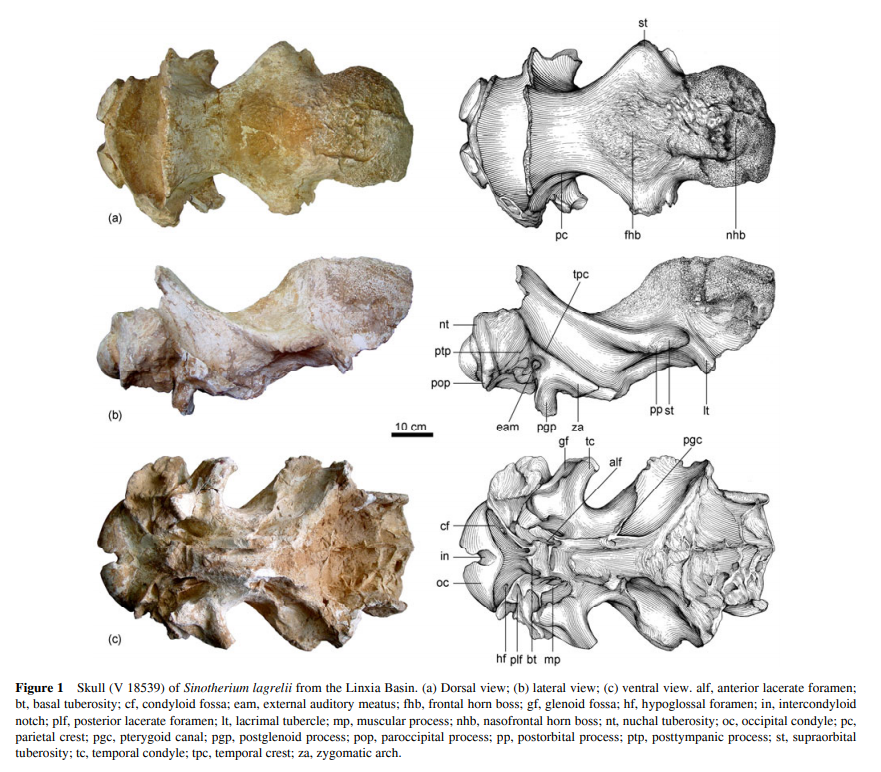
- Skull of Sinotherium
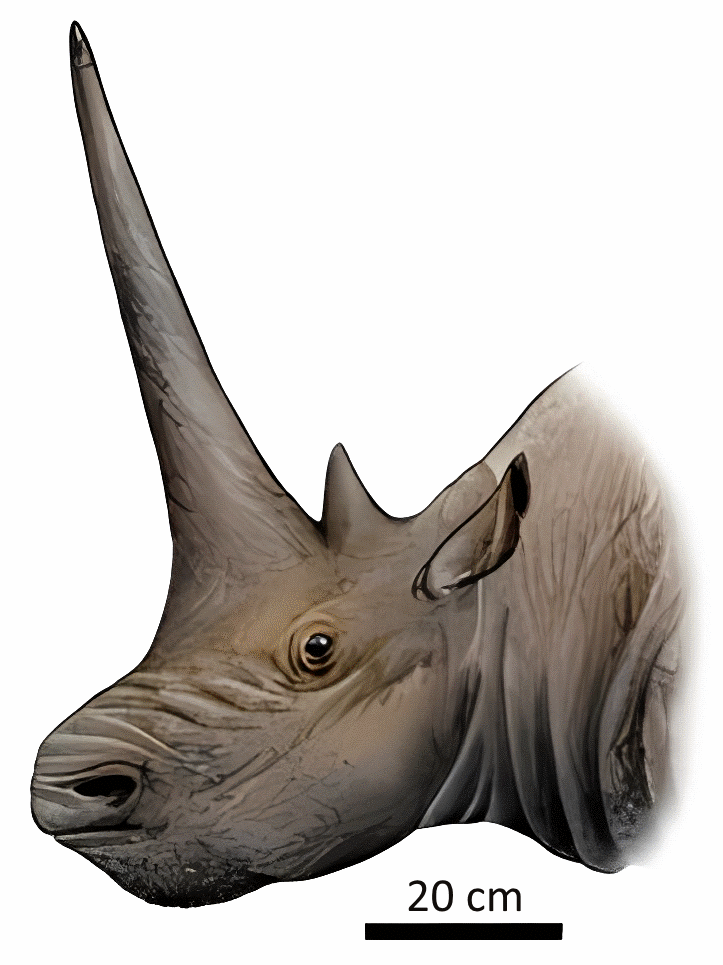
- Life restoration of S. lagrelii

Scientific classification
- Kingdom: Animalia
- Phylum: Chordata
- Class: Mammalia
- Infraclass: Placentalia
- Order: Perissodactyla
- Family: Rhinocerotidae
- Subfamily: †Elasmotheriinae
- Genus: †Sinotherium; Ringstrom, 1923

Type species
- †Sinotherium lagrelii Ringstrom, 1923

Other species
- †S. zaisanensis?

= Sinotherium =

Sinotherium Temporal range: Miocene–Pliocene

Extinct genus of mammals

Sinotherium ("Chinese Beast") is an extinct genus of single-horned elasmotheriine rhinocerotids that lived from the late Miocene (Tortonian - Messinian) to Early Pliocene. It was ancestral to Elasmotherium, demonstrating a very important evolutionary transition from nasal-horned elasmotheriines to frontal-horned elasmotheriines. Its fossils have been found in the Karabulak Formation of Kazakhstan, lower jaw and teeth have been found in Mongolia, and a partial skull is known from the upper part of the Liushu Formation of western China. Sinotherium diverged from the ancestral genus, Iranotherium, first found in Iran, during the early Pliocene. Some experts prefer to lump Sinotherium, and Iranotherium into Elasmotherium.

== Discovery, History and Taxonomy ==
=== Species ===
The type species of Sinotherium is S. lagrelii. It is also known to have an additional species from the Zaisan depression of Kazakhstan called S. zaisanensis, however, doubt has been raised on its validity.

=== Discovery ===
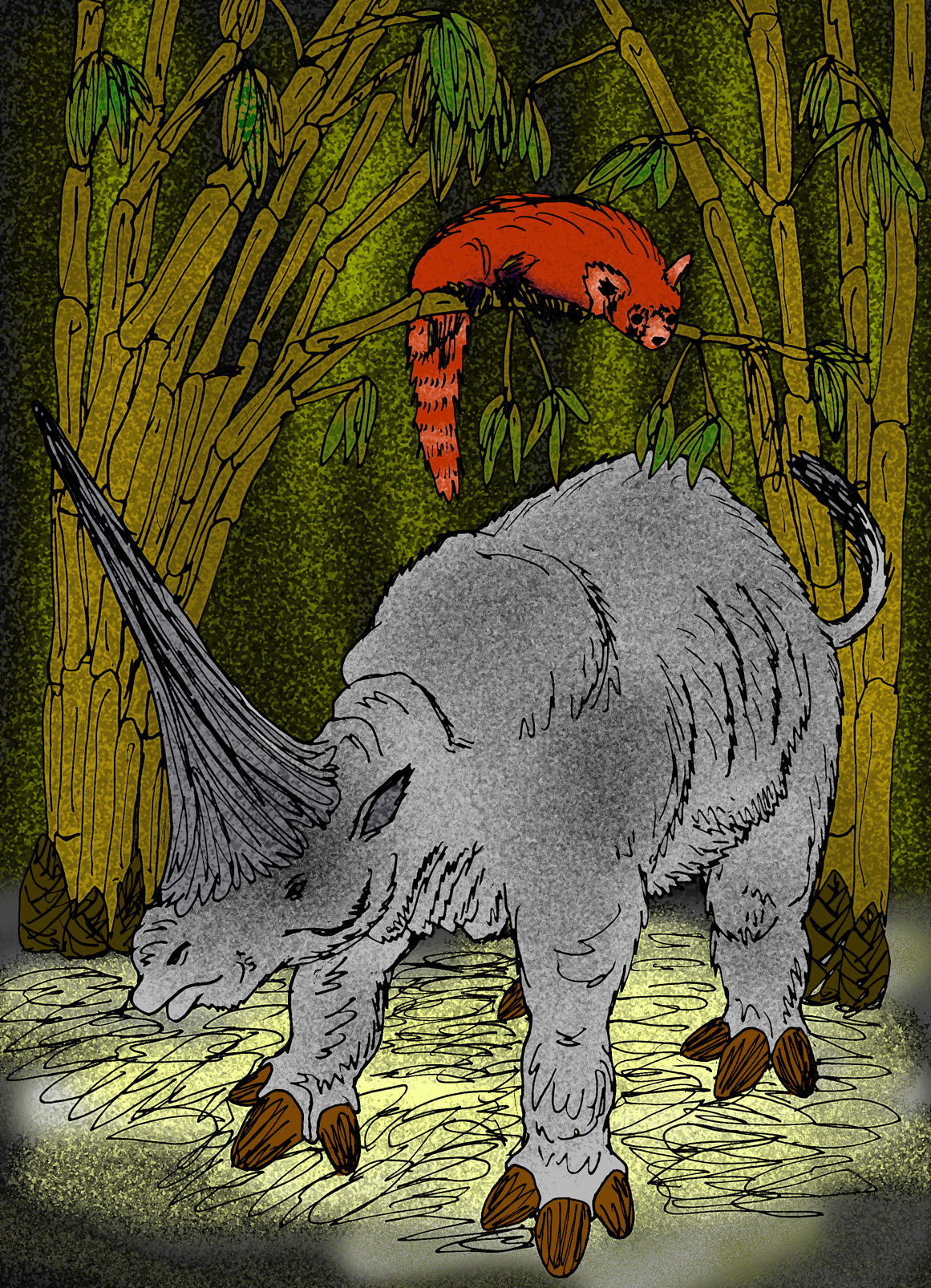
Restoration of S. lagreii alongside an Ailurid

Finds of Sinotherium are rather rare and often only fragmentary. The first fossils, which also led to the description of the rhinoceros genus, came to light at the beginning of the 20th century and were discovered by JG Andersson in the Baode district in the Chinese province of Shanxi in deposits from the Upper Miocene. These mainly consisted of isolated teeth, an upper jaw fragment with the preserved row of teeth from the second premolar to the penultimate molar, and a lower jaw fragment. From north-western Mongolia near Chono-Khariakha, a 72 cm long, well-preserved lower jaw was discovered which dates to the Lower Pliocene. Other individual finds are known from Kazakhstan, including a rear part of the skull with part of the teeth and several skeletal elements of the body. The most complete skull to date was found in the upper area of the Liushu Formation near Houaigou in the Guanghe District of Gansu Province. The Liushu Formation is about 100 m thick and over wide ranges of Linxia basin digested. This section is dated to about 7 to 6.4 million years and thus belongs to the end of the Miocene. The geological deposits of the Linxia Basin have already produced numerous well-preserved fossil rhinoceros remains, including numerous representatives of the Elasmotheriinae. Only the part of the snout is missing from the skull and it provided evidence of the location of the horns in Sinotherium.

== Description ==
=== Skull and horn ===
The horns of older elasmotheriines are present on their nasals (nose), whereas the horn of Sinotherium's descendant Elasmotherium is present on its frontals (forehead), Sinotherium shows a unique condition in which its horn is present in an intermediate "naso-frontal" position. This represents the horn shifting from its ancestral nasal position to the derived frontal position, eventually resulting in the completely frontal restricted position of Elasmotherium.

In addition to the nasofrontal horn, Sinotherium also preserves a rugosity on its forehead, just behind the nasofrontal horn, which implies that the animal had two horns.

== Paleobiology ==
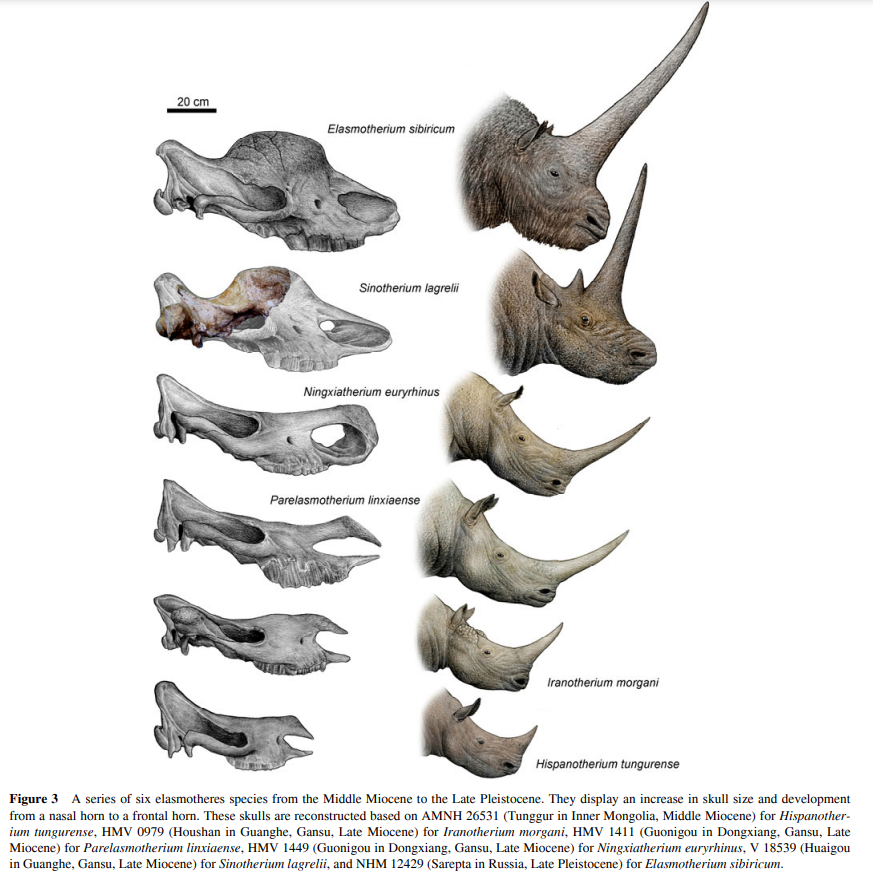
Reconstruction of cranial elasmotheriine evolution by Chen Yu. Illustration by Deng et al. 2013.

=== Evolution ===
Early elasmotheriine genera of the line leading to Elasmotherium, have a dolichocephalic skull supporting a horn growing on their nose, just like any other Rhinocerotid, however, Elasmotherium was the sole member of Elasmotheriinae that had a brachycephalic skull and supported a horn on its forehead instead. A transition between this state of nose-horned to forehead-horned elasmotheriines remained missing until 2012, when the first cranial remains of Sinotherium lagrelii, (specimen IVPP V 18539, a partial skull housed at the Institute of Vertebrate Paleontology and Paleoanthropology, Chinese Academy of Sciences in Beijing) was described, demonstrating a very important transition from nose-horned elasmotheriines like Ningxiatherium to forehead-horned elasmotheriines like Elasmotherium.

While the horns of Ningxiatherium-like elasmotheriines are present on their nasals, and the horn of Elasmotherium on its frontals, Sinotherium shows its horn to be present in a "nasofrontal" position, (present on both the nose and the forehead). This shows the horn shifting from its ancestral nasal position to a more derived frontal position, eventually resulting in the completely frontal restricted position of Elasmotherium.

== Distribution and paleoecology ==
Sinotherium first appeared during the Late Miocene, occupying east Asian and Mid-Asian regions, but remains dating to the Early Pliocene can be found from eastern Asia to as far as the Kumo-Manych depression of South-Western Russia. This showed that at the beginning of the Pliocene (5.3–4.8 Mya), Sinotherium had significantly expanded its range westward. Sinotherium is known from Pliocene to Late Miocene deposits of Kazakhstan, Mongolia, and China.

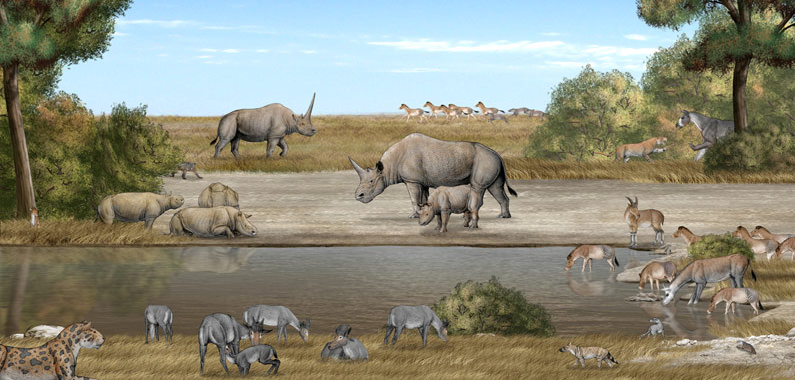
Reconstruction of Liushu formation ecosystem by Chen Yu. Illustration from Deng et al. 2013.

In China, the species S. lagrelii is known from an age of 7 Ma from the Late Miocene Liushu Formation in the Linxia Basin, Gansu Province. Pollen analysis from the red beds of the Liushu Formation suggests that the unit was once a subarid to arid steppe, as evidenced by a high frequency of xerophilous and sub-xerophilous grasses and lower frequency of warm temperate broadleaf trees. Other fauna present in the Liushi Formation include bears (Ursavus sp.), mustelids (Parataxidea sinensis), hyenas (Hyaenictitherium wongii, H. hyaenoides, Ictitherium sp.), felids (Amphimachairodus giganteus, Metailurus major, Felis sp.), chalicotheres (Ancylotherium sp.), horses (Hipparion coelophyes), deer (Dicrocerus sp.), giraffids (Palaeotragus microdon), and bovids (Sinotragus wimani, Tsaidamotherium hedini and Protoryx sp.).

In Kazakhstan, Sinotherium zaisanensis is known from the Karabulak formation which dates to 6.3–6.5 Ma (Late Miocene). It coexisted with four caniforms (Martes sp., Promeles sp., Plesiogulo crassa Teilhard, Indarctos punjabiensis), three feliforms (Adcrocuta eximia, Hyaenictitherium hyaenoides orlovi, Amphimachairodus kurteni), three perissodactyls (Hipparion hippidiodus, H. elegans, Chilotherium sp.), and six artiodactyls (Cervavitus novorossiae, Procapreolus latifrons, Samotherium cf. irtyshense, Paleotragus (Yuorlovia) asiaticus, Tragoportax sp., Gazella dorcadoides). The climate that Sinotherium zaisanensis lived in was mild and arid. It was a habitat of wide, open steppes.
