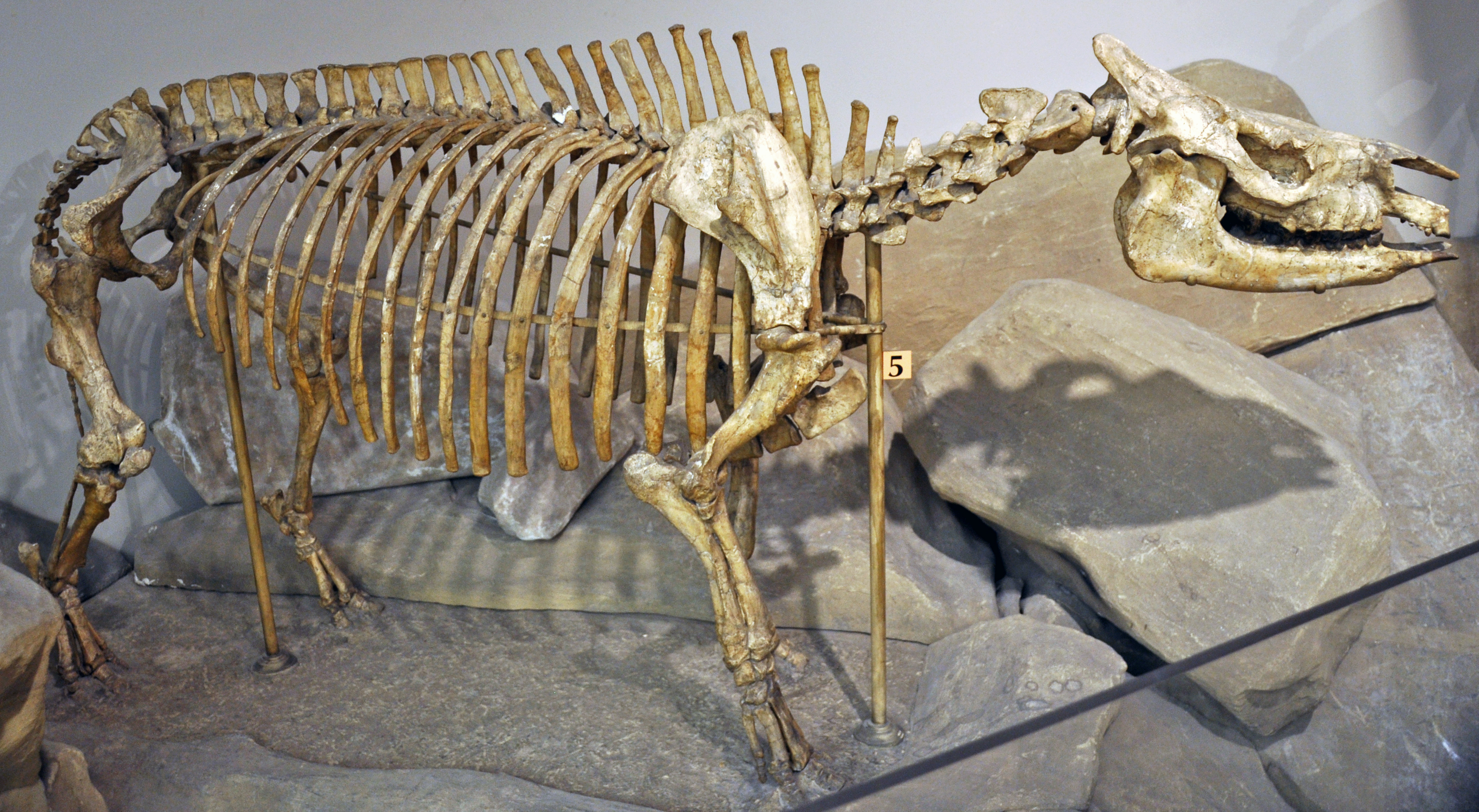
- T. osborni

Scientific classification
- Kingdom: Animalia
- Phylum: Chordata
- Class: Mammalia
- Order: Perissodactyla
- Family: Rhinocerotidae
- Genus: †Trigonias; Lucas, 1900

Type species
- †Trigonias osborni

Species
- †T. osborni; †T. wellsi

Synonyms
- †Procaenopus Figgins, 1934

= Trigonias =

Trigonias Temporal range: late Eocene

Extinct genus of mammals

Trigonias (Greek: "triangular" (trigonos), "ias" [denotes possession]) is an extinct genus of rhinocerotid from the late Eocene (Chadronian) some 35 million years ago of North America.

== Description ==
Trigonias was about 2.1 metres (6 ft 11 in) long and, despite lacking horns, looked a lot like modern rhinos. The front feet bore four toes (as contrasted with three in modern rhinos), the fifth of which was entirely reduced. The median digit was already the largest, whilst the second and the fourth formed a symmetrical pair. The hind feet had only three digits.

The shape of the anterior incisors in the upper jaw of Trigonias assume a chisel-like shape. The other two incisors are less derived. Trigonias also bore a reduced upper canine, unlike most rhinocerotids. In the lower jaw, the second incisor grew large and tusk-like, and there was no canine. Trigonias also had small premolars when compared to the molars. The dental formula of Triognias was 3,1,4,33,0,4,3 × 2 = 42.

A specimen of T. osborni was estimated to have a weight of about 391 kilograms (862 lb).

== Classification ==
Cladogram after Lu, Deng and Pandolfi, 2023:

- Rhinocerotidae
  - Trigonias
  - - Ronzotherium
    - - Epiaceratherium
      - - Diceratherium
        - - Molassitherium
          - - Skinneroceras
            - - Aceratheriinae (including Teleoceratini)
              - - Protaceratherium
                - - Menoceras
                  - - Rhinocerotinae (modern rhinoceroses)
                    - Elasmotheriinae
