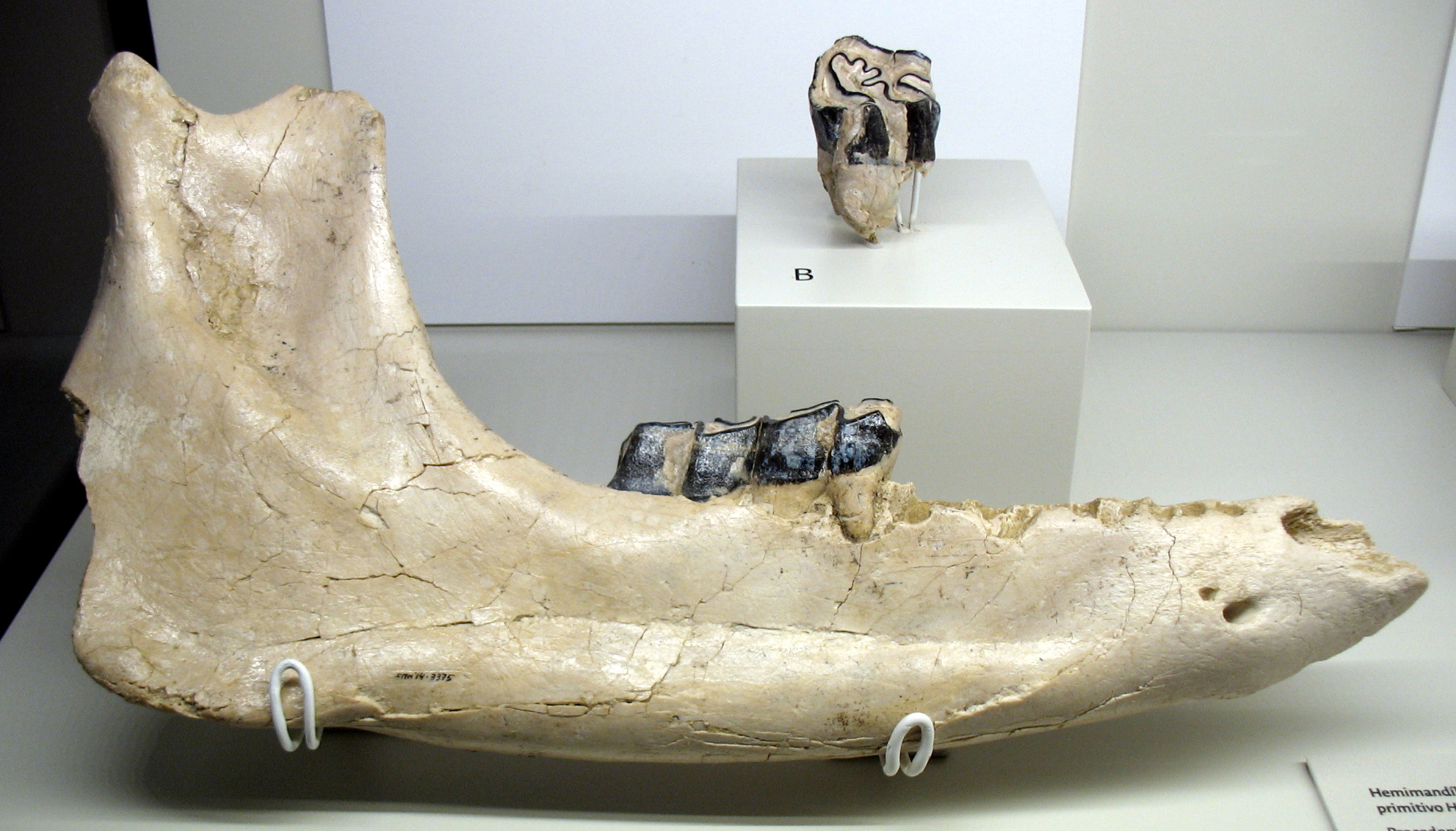
- Hispanotherium matritense teeth and mandible

Scientific classification
- Kingdom: Animalia
- Phylum: Chordata
- Class: Mammalia
- Infraclass: Placentalia
- Order: Perissodactyla
- Family: Rhinocerotidae
- Subfamily: †Elasmotheriinae
- Genus: †Hispanotherium; Crusafont and Villalte, 1947

Species
- H. beonense (Antoine, 1997); H. corcolense Antoine, Iñigo & Alférez, 2002; H. matritense (Prado, 1864) (type); H. wushanense Sun et al., 2018

= Hispanotherium =

Hispanotherium Temporal range: Middle Miocene–Late Miocene
- Skull of Hispanotherium in side-on view

Extinct genus of mammal

Hispanotherium is an extinct genus of rhinocerotid of the tribe Elasmotheriini endemic to Europe and Asia during the Miocene living from 16 to 7.25 mya existing for approximately 8.75 million years.

== Taxonomy ==
Hispanotherium was erected by Crusafont and Villalta (1947) for the nominal species "Rhinoceros" matritense. The Asian form Huaqingtherium was once assigned to Hispanotherium, but was eventually recognized as distinct.

== Palaeobiology ==
=== Palaeoecology ===
H. beonense is suggested to have been a mixed feeder as evidenced by its dental microwear and mesowear. Stable isotope analysis of Hispanotherium from the Linxia Basin of Gansu, China indicates that it foraged predominantly in open environments.
