= Kenyatherium =

Scientific classification
- Kingdom: Animalia
- Phylum: Chordata
- Class: Mammalia
- Order: Perissodactyla
- Family: Rhinocerotidae
- Genus: †Kenyatherium; Aguirre & Guerin, 1974
- Species: †K. bishopi

Binomial name
- †Kenyatherium bishopi Aguirre & Guerin, 1974

Kenyatherium is an extinct genus of rhinocerotid that lived in Africa during the Neogene period. Its only species is K. bishopi.

== Distribution ==
Kenyatherium bishopi is known from the site of Nakali in Kenya, dating to the Miocene epoch.
