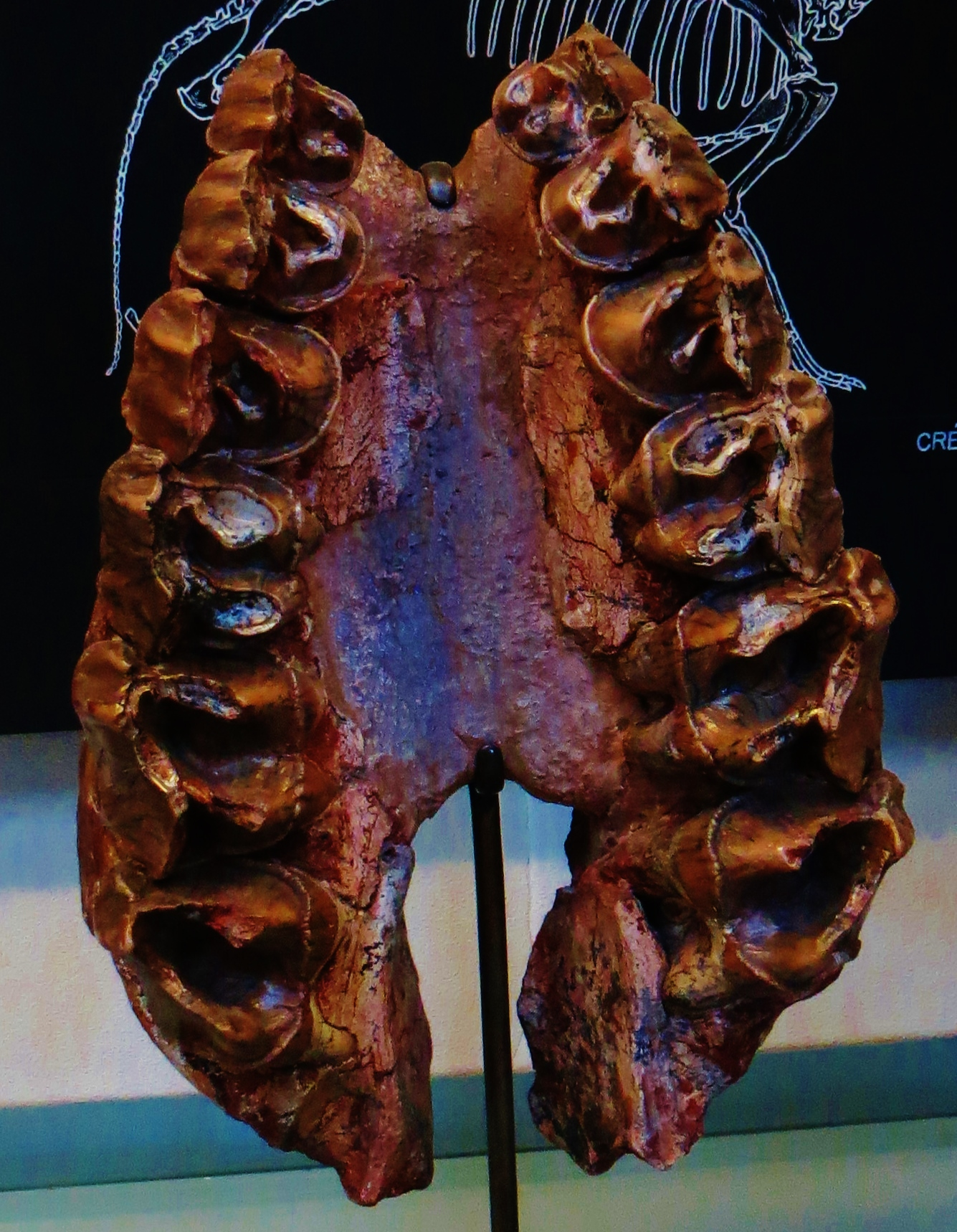
- R. filholi maxilla from the Phosphatiere de Quercy, France, in Musee d'Histoire Naturelle, Paris

Scientific classification
- Kingdom: Animalia
- Phylum: Chordata
- Class: Mammalia
- Order: Perissodactyla
- Suborder: Ceratomorpha
- Family: Rhinocerotidae
- Genus: †Ronzotherium; Aymard, 1854

Type species
- †Ronzotherium velaunum Lartet, 1851

Species
- See text

= Ronzotherium =

Ronzotherium Temporal range: Late Eocene - Late Oligocene

Extinct genus of mammals

Ronzotherium is an extinct genus of perissodactyl mammal from the family Rhinocerotidae. The name derives from the hill of 'Ronzon', the French locality near Le Puy-en-Velay at which it was first discovered, and the Greek suffix 'therium' meaning 'beast'. At present 5 species have been identified from several localities in Europe and Asia, spanning the Late Eocene to Upper Oligocene (37 - 23 million years ago).

== Description ==
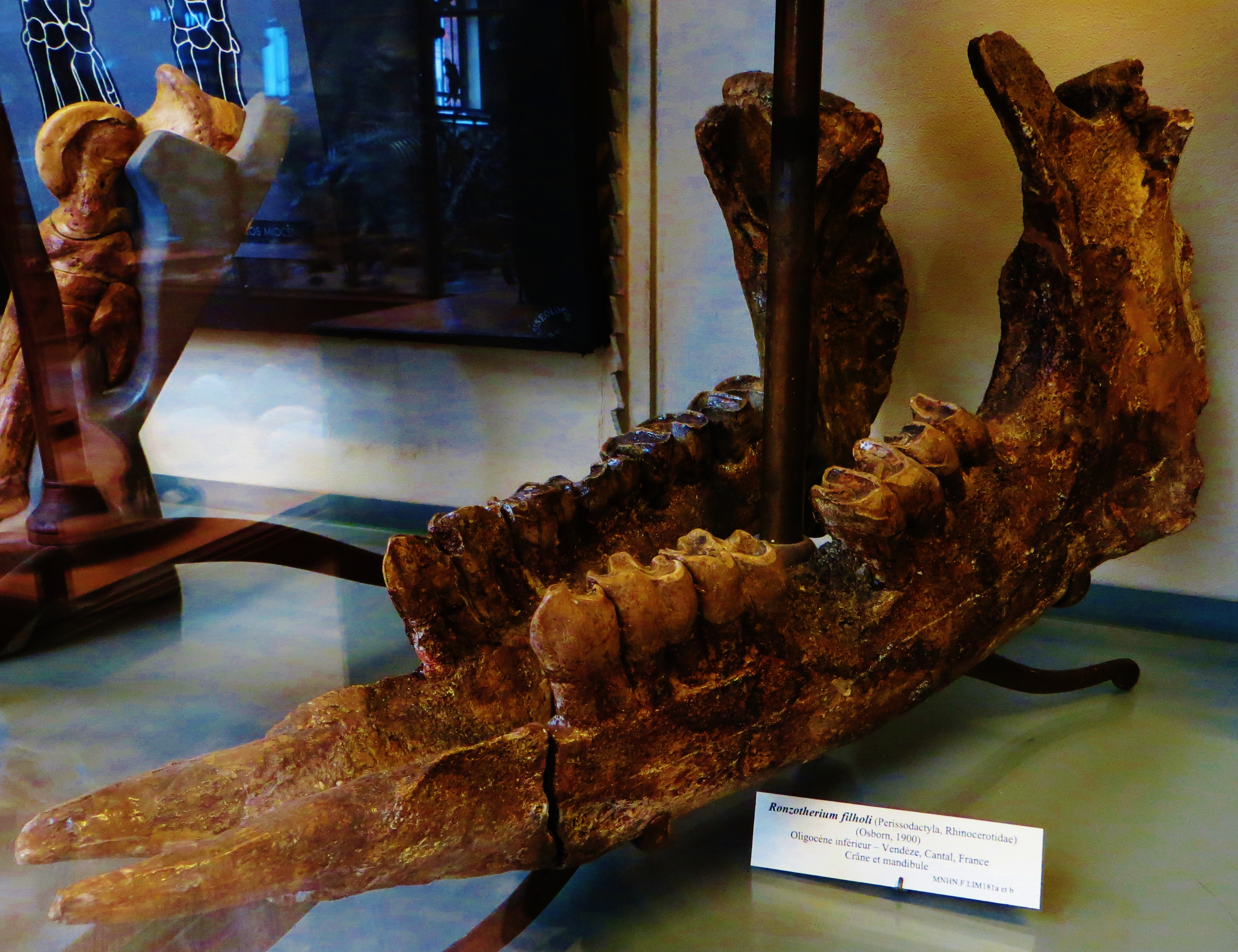
R. filholi mandible, Musee d'Histoire Naturelle, Paris

Ronzotherium was a small to mid-sized rhinocerotid. Smaller species weighed in the region of 1t, while larger species could reach 1.9t in weight. The genus was similar in weight to the extant black rhinoceros although with an overall more slender and gracile build, with a long humerus and femur in comparison to other rhinocerotids. The genus shows a trend for increased size, with later species being considerably larger than some of its first representatives.

Ronzotherium did not possess a nasal horn. Instead the nasal bones were retracted, suggesting the presence of a large prehensile upper lip like those seen in modern rhinoceros species. The lower incisors of Ronzotherium were long and tusk- like, with a large diastema in the lower jaw between the incisors and other teeth. The upper incisors were much smaller. The forelimbs were tetradactyl with a prominent central metapodal. The hindlimbs however were tridactyl, with three toes.

== Classification ==
Ronzotherium is one of the basal members of the family Rhinocerotidae. Cladogram after Lu, Deng and Pandolfi, 2023:

- Rhinocerotidae
  - Trigonias
  - - Ronzotherium
    - - Epiaceratherium
      - - Diceratherium
        - - Molassitherium
          - - Skinneroceras
            - - Aceratheriinae (including Teleoceratini)
              - - Protaceratherium
                - - Menoceras
                  - - Rhinocerotinae (modern rhinoceroses)
                    - Elasmotheriinae

5 species have been identified within the genus:

- Ronzotherium velaunum (Aymard, 1853)
- Ronzotherium filholi (Osborn, 1900)
- Ronzotherium romani (Kretzoi, 1945)
- Ronzotherium orientale (Dashzeveg, 1991)
- Ronzotherium brevirostre (Beliajeva, 1954)

The 3 European species are believed to have dispersed into Europe during the lower Rupelian as part of the Grande Coupure, and were seemingly widespread in the post-grande coupure fauna of Europe, with fossils discovered in Rupelian deposits from the United Kingdom, France, Germany, Italy, Switzerland, and the Czech Republic. Ronzotherium brevirostre and Ronzotherium orientale are known exclusively from the Late Eocene of Mongolia. Further material has been found in the Linxia basin in China's gansu province.

== Palaeobiology ==
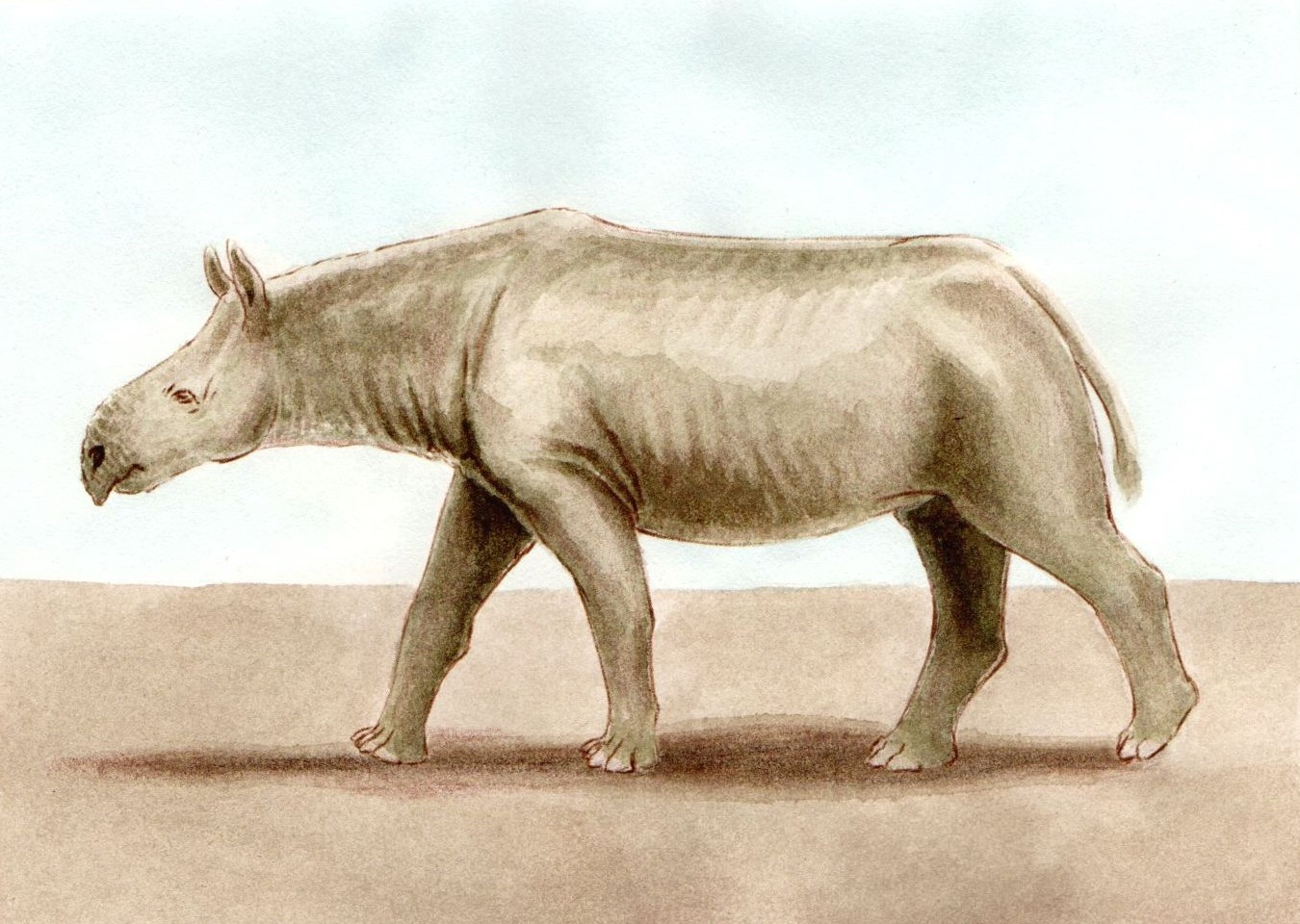
Life restoration

Isotope analysis of teeth discovered at Rickenbach in Switzerland has shown that european Ronzotherium species were adapted to the increasingly drier climate and open landscapes of the post-grande coupure Oligocene. The low crowned dentition suggests that Ronzotherium was a browser, feeding on the leaves of shrubs, bushes, and small trees. This is supported by the presence of the a prehensile upper lip which is used by modern rhinocerotids to browse on foliage.

The gracile build and long limb bones found in Ronzotherium suggest that it could have been capable of sustained running.

== Ichnology ==
Fossil rhinocerotid trackways assigned to the ichnotaxon Rhinoceripeda voconsense (Vialov 1966) have been discovered at two sites in the Luberon Natural Regional Park in southeast France. The trackways are preserved in the Calcaires de La Fayette, a calcareous lacustrian deposit dating to the lower Rupelian, and are exposed at Saignon and Viens. Various other trackways including artiodactyls and possibly creodonts are also present. Based on the 1974 discovery of a Ronzotherium velaunum mandible in lower Oligocene strata at Viens, the tracks are attributed to Ronzotherium.

== Localities ==
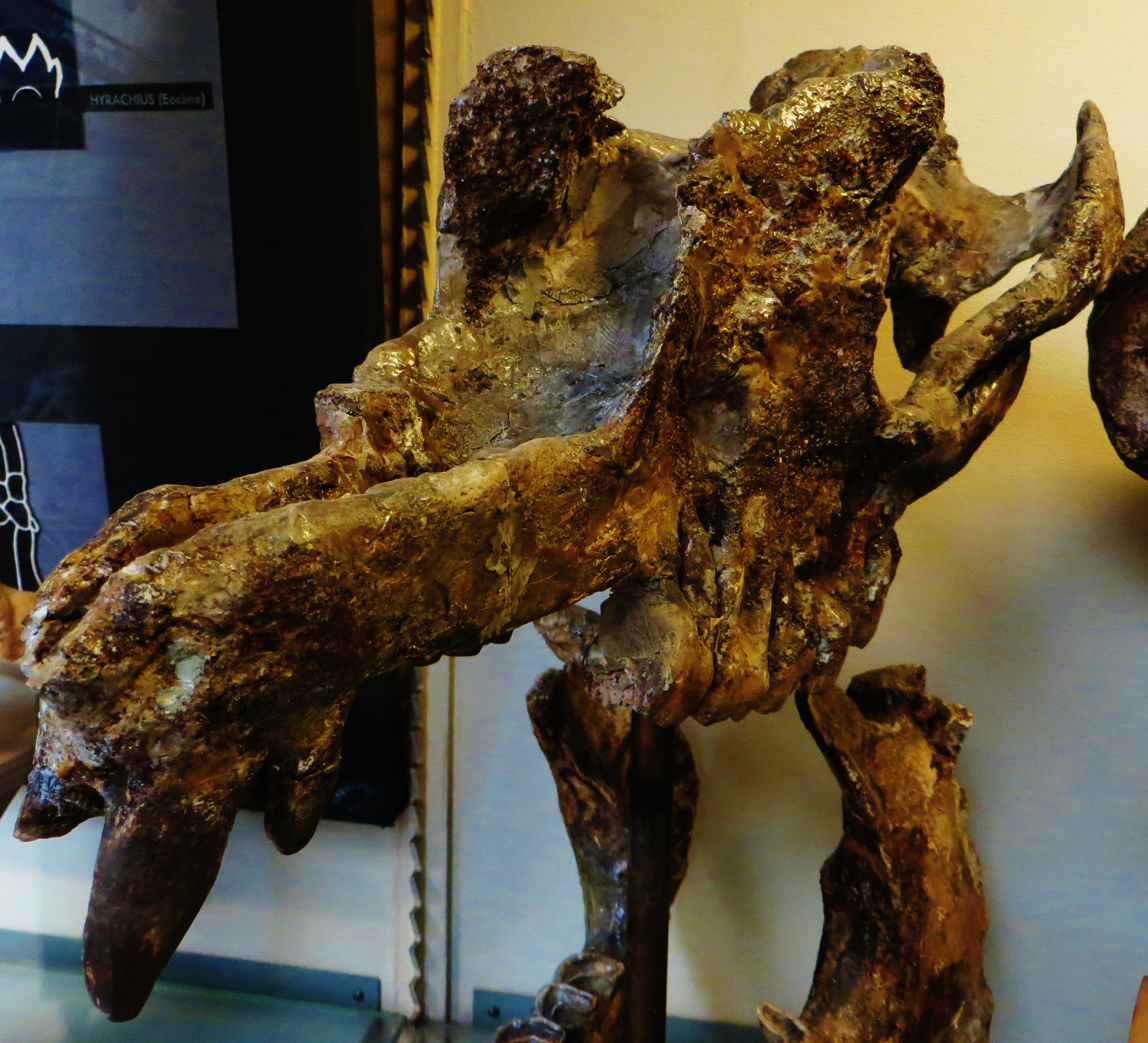
R. filholi skull in Musee d'Histoire Naturelle, Paris

=== United Kingdom ===
In the United Kingdom rare isolated teeth and bone fragments, attributed to Ronzotherium romani, have been found from the Rupelian aged Bouldnor Formation on the Isle Of Wight. Here Ronzotherium formed part of the post-grande coupure fauna alongside anthracotheres, entelodonts, and a variety of other Asian derived groups.

=== France ===
Ronzotherium remains have been recovered from numerous Oligocene sites throughout France. In the Rupelian strata of the Paris Basin material attributed to R.romani has been collected from Etampes and Ferte-Alais. In south-western France the fossiliferous Quercy Phosphorites Formation has produced Ronzotherium material, including an intact maxilla. A large majority of France's Ronzotherium material comes from the Oligocene deposits of the Luberon Massif, northwest of the city of Marseille. Here fossil trackways and bone fragments of Ronzotherium dating from the early Oligocene have been discovered at the villages of Saignon and Viens. Further south at Les Milles bone fragments and a nearly intact mandible have been collected. Finds have also come from the city of Marseille itself. At Saint-Henri and Saint-Andre in the north of the city 50 fragments of bone and dentition have been recovered, including a mandible and semi-intact upper jaw

=== Germany ===
The Espenhain mines in Saxony have produced a series of Ronzotherium teeth. The locality, south of Leipzig, exposes the Bohn Formation, a predominantly marine sequence of Rupelian age that has preserved a rich terrestrial fauna of post-grande coupure mammals.

=== Switzerland ===
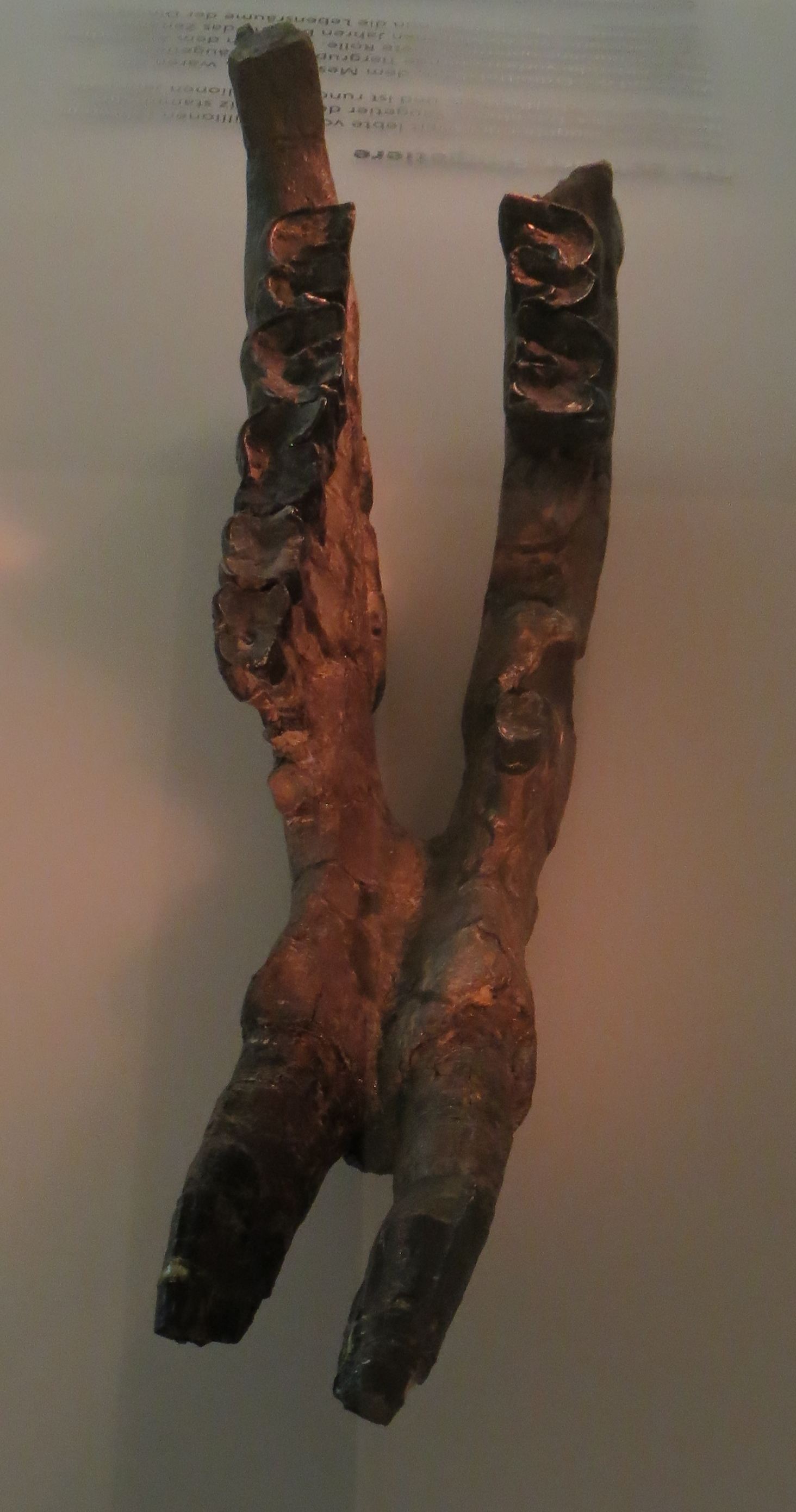
R. filholi mandible in Natural History Museum, Basel

Switzerland preserves the oldest, and some of the youngest evidence of the genus in Europe. At Kleinblauen and Bressaucourt in northwest Switzerland the mandible of a juvenile animal, along with other finds, provides the earliest known occurrence of Ronzotherium in Europe. At the late Oligocene locality of Rickenbach 35 fragments of cranial and post-cranial material have been recovered from Chattian strata.

=== Asia ===
The late eocene Ergilin Dzo Formation in Mongolia has produced the remains of two species of Ronzotherium; R.brevirostre and R.orientale. This is the earliest known occurrence of the genus, dated at 37 million years ago. Further asian finds come from the Late Oligocene of China's Linxia Basin, where an unspecified species of Ronzotherium lived alongside a diversity of other late Paleogene rhinocerotids.
