= Ougandatherium =

Ougandatherium Temporal range: Burdigalian

Scientific classification
- Kingdom: Animalia
- Phylum: Chordata
- Class: Mammalia
- Order: Perissodactyla
- Family: Rhinocerotidae
- Genus: †Ougandatherium
- Species: †O. napakense

Binomial name
- †Ougandatherium napakense Guérin and Pickford, 2003

Extinct genus of rhinoceros

Ougandatherium is an extinct monotypic genus of iranotheriine rhinoceros that lived in Africa during the Burdigalian stage of the Early Miocene subepoch.

== Etymology ==
The generic name Ougandatherium derives from the name of the country of Uganda and the Greek word for mammal, therion. The specific epithet of the type species, Ougandatherium napakense, references the Napak I fossil site where the holotype was discovered.
