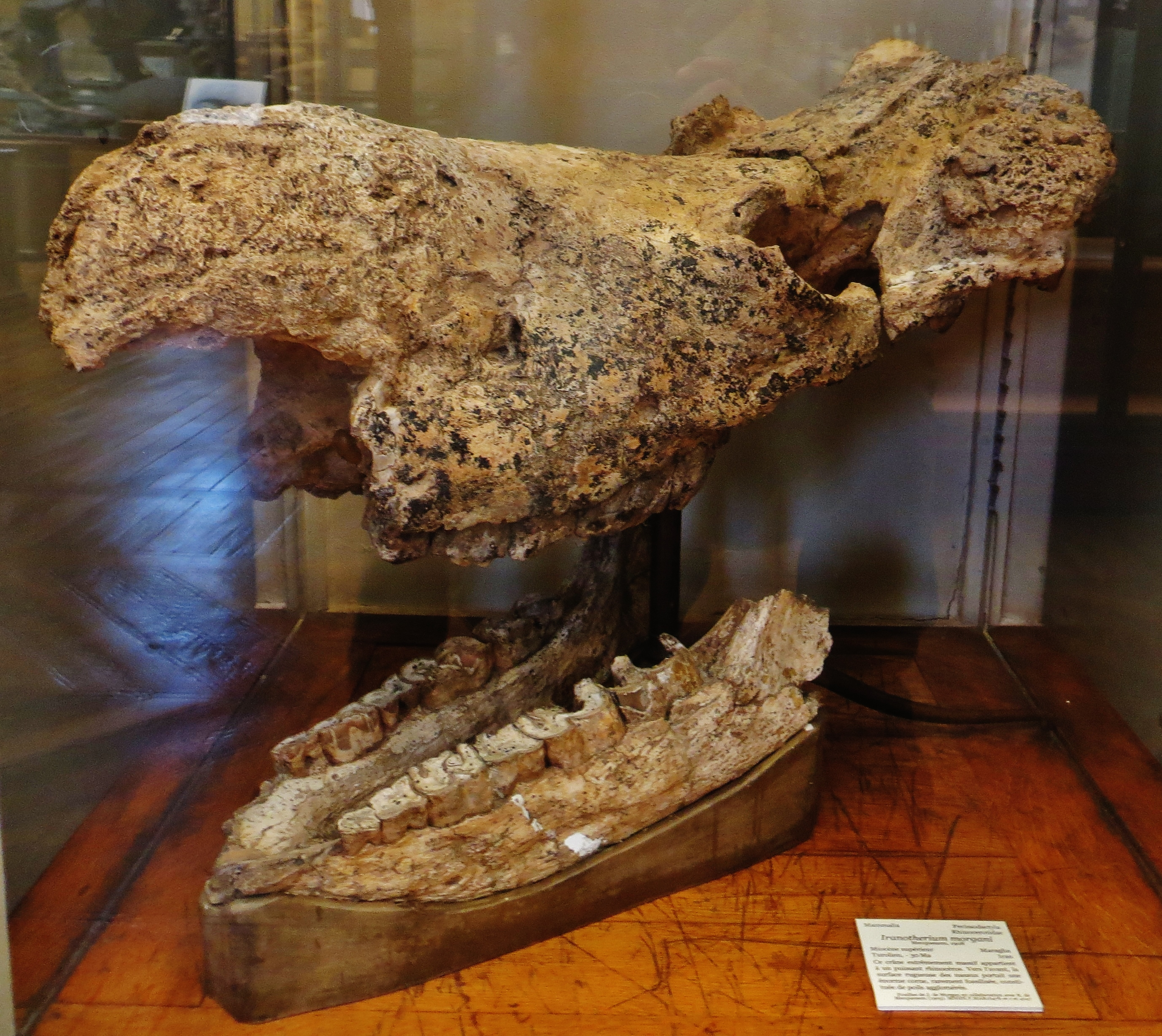
- Iranotherium morgani

Scientific classification
- Kingdom: Animalia
- Phylum: Chordata
- Class: Mammalia
- Order: Perissodactyla
- Family: Rhinocerotidae
- Subfamily: †Elasmotheriinae
- Genus: †Iranotherium; Ringström 1924
- Species: †I. morgani

Binomial name
- †Iranotherium morgani (Mecquenem, 1908)

Synonyms
- Rhinoceros morgani Mecquenem, 1908

= Iranotherium =

Iranotherium Temporal range: Late Miocene

Extinct genus of mammal

Iranotherium ("Beast of Iran") is an extinct genus of large elasmotheriine rhinocerotids, comparable in size to a modern white rhino. It is known from the Late Miocene (Tortonian) of Maragha, Iran and the middle part of the Liushu formation of northwestern China. It was a precursor to the related Sinotherium and may have been ultimately outcompeted by its descendant. This species is most well known for showing unique sexual dimorphism among rhinos.

== Description ==
Iranotherium is only known from cranial material, and rare postcranial elements.

=== Skull and Horn ===
Skull of Iranotherium

The skull is long and dorsally concave, with a length of 775 mm. The parietal crests are broad, the nasal bone is long and wide, with a shallow U-shaped nasal notch, the orbit is prominent and has a high position close to the skull roof, the first half of the zygomatic arch is narrow. The skulls also show distinct sexual dimorphism: The base from which the horn grows is large and strong in the male, while it is small and weak in the female, and there is strong and rough rugosities present on the back half part of the zygomatic arch of the male. The back half of the zygoma is also uplifted and higher than the skull roof.

=== Dentition ===
Iranotherium teeth are hypsodont, (they were covered and filled by cement), meaning that Iranotherium was a grazer that fed on grasses. Its upper incisors are completely absent and the premolars are significantly shortened, however, the cheek teeth are longer in the male than in the female.

== Discovery and history ==
=== Original discovery ===
When Iranotherium was originally discovered from teeth, it was recognized that this species was similar to the rhino Elasmotherium and was the ancestor of the latter (This was before Sinotherium was discovered), however in 1908, when it was published as a new species, it was strangely referred to the genus Rhinoceros. In 1924, the material of R. morgani from Maragha was further described. Ringström suggested that this species did not belong in Rhinoceros, referring it to his new genus Iranotherium as I. morgani.

Iranotherium as a genus was originally described in 1908 by Mecquenem where no holotype was designated for the genus. Specimen MNHN 1905–10, a skull and associated atlas vertebra from Maragha, Iran was chosen as the lectotype for this genus.

=== Later Discoveries ===
In 2005, three specimens of Iranotherium were described by Tao Deng. Two of these specimens were complete skulls that showed evidence of unique sexual dimorphism. These specimens are: HMV 0979, a complete young male skull, HMV 1098, a complete adult female skull and finally HMV 1099, known only from a mandible belonging to an adult that is missing the ascending ramus. All specimens were found from the lower part of the upper Miocene Liushu Formation in the Linxia Basin (Gansu, China). HMV 0979 and HMV 1099 were discovered at Houshan village, and HMV 1098 at Shanzhuang village.

The studied skulls and mandible from the Linxia Basin, especially HMV 0979 and HMV 1099, are found to be generally similar to the skull and mandible of Iranotherium morgani from Maragha, with minor differences, like the length ratio of lower premolars to molars. This difference is considered to be due to individual or sexual variations and is not sufficient for establishing a new species. Hence, all three specimens described have been assigned to the genus Iranotherium by Deng. Based on the two skulls from the study, the Maragha specimen is identified as a male due to the presence of hemispherical rugosities on its zygoma.

== Paleobiology ==
=== Feeding ===
Iranotherium was a grazer as indicated by its hypsodont (high crowned) teeth.

The absolute body size of an herbivore is very important in determining the fiber/protein ratio that an animal will be able to tolerate in its diet, as larger animals require proportionately less protein and will be able to tolerate a larger proportion of cellulose. Therefore, the giant body size of I. morgani implies that this species grazed high-fiber grasses. I. morgani obviously inhabited an open grassland.

=== Sexual variation ===
In 2005, two skulls of Iranotherium were described by Tao Deng. One skull was from an adult female Iranotherium and the other from a young adult male. These skulls, when compared showed significant, sexually dimorphic differences. The male had rugosities present on each zygomatic arch, whereas the females lacked them entirely. This unique feature is virtually unknown among other rhinocerotids. Male Iranotherium are hypothesized to bear it for supporting larger masseteric and temporalis musculature.

Additional sexually dimorphic features include the zygomatic arch of the male being thicker than that of the female. The anterior part of the nasals are wider and rougher in the male, but narrow and smooth in the female; this difference is related to the large rugose area at the front of the skull in the male, which is smaller in the female, which Deng suggested represented the base for a nasal horn. Because the nasal horn boss of the male is a large dome, its nasal groove is distinctly deeper than that of the female. The nasal horn boss of the male is much rougher and likely to have supported a larger horn than that of the female. The skull roof of the male is less curved than that of the female, and the frontal region of the male is more convex than that of the female. Therefore, the overall structure of the whole skull of the male is more robust than that of the female. Deng hypothesised that these features, especially the conjectured huge nasal horn, could be used for defense or competition for mates. The zygomatic rugosities of the male I. morgani could have supported a horn-like callused structure for combat or for display. Because these hypertrophies are different from the horn boss rugosities associated with the true horns in rhinos, they are probably indicative of the presence of larger masseteric and temporal muscles and the overall robustness of the skull. A 2009 study questioned whether non-rhinocertotine rhinoceroses like Iranotherium had horns at all due to lacking the ring-like rugosities on the skull where the horns attach as is found in Rhinocerotinae.

== Distribution and paleoecology ==
Iranotherium is so far only known from Iran and China.

In Iran, Iranotherium is known from the middle local biozones of the Maragha fauna, from an age of between 9 and 7.6 Ma. Over there, it coexisted with Hipparion prostylum, Mesopithecus pentelici and Indarctos maraghanus.

In China, Iranotherium is known from the middle part of the Liushu formation of the Linxia Basin. I. morgani appeared in Linxia earlier than in Maragha. I. morgani is likely to have first appeared in northwestern China and then dispersed westward to central Asia. The fauna that Iranotherium was a part of is known as the Dashengou fauna. It was contemporary with one glire (Pararhizomys hipparionum), four mustelids (Promephitis sp., P. hootoni, Melodon majori, Sinictis sp.), four hyaenids (Ictitherium sp., Hyaenictitherium wongii, H. hyaenoides, Dinocrocuta gigantea), two cats (Amphimachairodus hezhengensis, Felis sp.), one proboscidean (Tetralophodon exoletus), four perissodactyls (Hipparion chiai, H. weihoensis, Acerorhinus hezhengensis, Chilotherium wimani), seven artiodactyls (Chleuastochoerus stehlini, Dicrocerus sp., Samotherium sp., Honanotherium schlosseri, Gazella sp., Hezhengia bohlini, and Miotragocerus sp.) Based on pollen analysis, the vegetation of the Liushu Formation belonged to an arid steppe.

== Bibliography ==
- Deng, T. (2005). New discovery of Iranotherium morgani (Perissodactyla, Rhinocerotidae) from the late Miocene of the Linxia Basin in Gansu, China, and its sexual dimorphism. Journal of vertebrate Paleontology, 25(2), 442–450.
- Ringström, T. (1924). "Nashorner der Hipparion-fauna Nord-Chinas". Palaeontologia Sinica. 1 (4): 1–159. OCLC 702555572.
