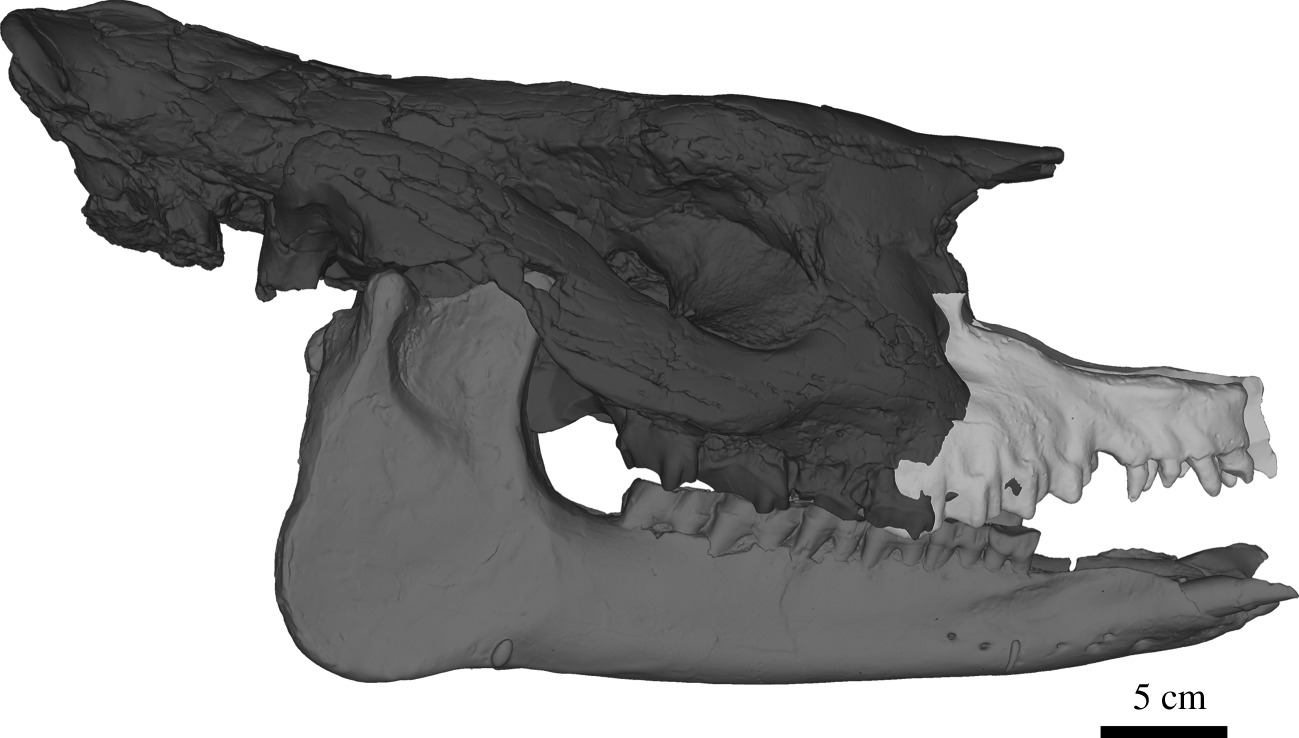
- Composite skull and jaws made from the remains of multiple Epiaceratherium species

Scientific classification
- Kingdom: Animalia
- Phylum: Chordata
- Class: Mammalia
- Order: Perissodactyla
- Family: Rhinocerotidae
- Genus: †Epiaceratherium; Abel, 1910

Species
- Epiaceratherium bolcense Abel, 1910 (type); Epiaceratherium magnum Uhlig 1999; Epiaceratherium delemontense (Becker & Antoine, 2013); Epiaceratherium naduongense Böhme et al., 2013; Epiaceratherium itjilik Fraser et al. 2025

= Epiaceratherium =

Epiaceratherium Temporal range: Middle Eocene–Early Miocene

Extinct genus of mammals

Epiaceratherium is an extinct genus of rhinocerotid from the mid-late Eocene, Oligocene and Early Miocene of Europe, Asia, and North America.

== Taxonomy ==
Epiaceratherium was one of the first rhinoceros genera to reach Europe after the Grande Coupure. The genus was named by paleontologist Othenio Abel in 1910, with the type species being Epiaceratherium bolcense. This species is exclusively known from remains found at Monteviale in northern Italy, dating to the earliest Oligocene (~34 million years ago). The species Epiaceratherium magnum named by Uhlig, 1999, is known from remains found in Germany, France, Czechia and Switzerland, dating to the Early Oligocene to early Late Oligocene. Remains similar to this species have also been reported from Pakistan, dating to the Early Oligocene. In 2013 the species Epiaceratherium naduongense was described from Na Duong Basin in northern Vietnam, dating to the mid-late Eocene (~39–35 million years ago). In 2021, the species Molassitherium delemontense originally described in 2013 from late Early–early Late Oligocene deposits in Germany, Switzerland, France, was reassigned to Epiaceratherium. The species E. itjilik (with the species name meaning "frost" or "frosty" in Inuktitut) was described in 2025 from remains found in Haughton crater on Devon Island in the high Canadian Arctic, likely dating to the early Miocene, around 24-21 million years ago.

While sometimes considered to be a member of Rhinocerotinae (and thus more closely related to living rhinoceroses than to Elasmotheriinae), recent phylogenetic studies have recovered Epiaceratherium as primitive basal rhinocerotid, outside the split between Aceratheriinae, Elasmotheriinae and crown group Rhinocerotinae. The phylogenetic analysis of Paterson et al. (2025), incorporating data from tooth enamel protein sequences recovered from Haughton crater specimens, which are the currently oldest sequenced proteins, support placement of Epiaceratherium as a member of a rhinocerotid lineage that diverged before the Rhinocerotinae–Elasmotheriinae split. Cladogram after Lu, Deng and Pandolfi, 2023:

- Rhinocerotidae
  - Trigonias
  - - Ronzotherium
    - - Epiaceratherium
      - - Diceratherium
        - - Molassitherium
          - - Skinneroceras
            - - Aceratheriinae (including Teleoceratini)
              - - Protaceratherium
                - - Menoceras
                  - - Rhinocerotinae (modern rhinoceroses)
                    - Elasmotheriinae

== Description ==
Epiaceratherium is distinctive from other basal rhinocerotids in lacking a lower third incisor (i3) as well as a lower canine, among a number of other characters of the premolar and molar teeth. Species of the genus lacked horns. The genus was relatively small in comparison to modern rhinoceroses with Epiaceratherium magnum and Epiaceratherium bolcense estimated to weigh 476–736 kilograms (1,049–1,623 lb) and 372–519 kilograms (820–1,144 lb) respectively in a 2015 study. The hindfeet had three digits with hooves, while the forefeet had four, unlike modern rhinoceros.
