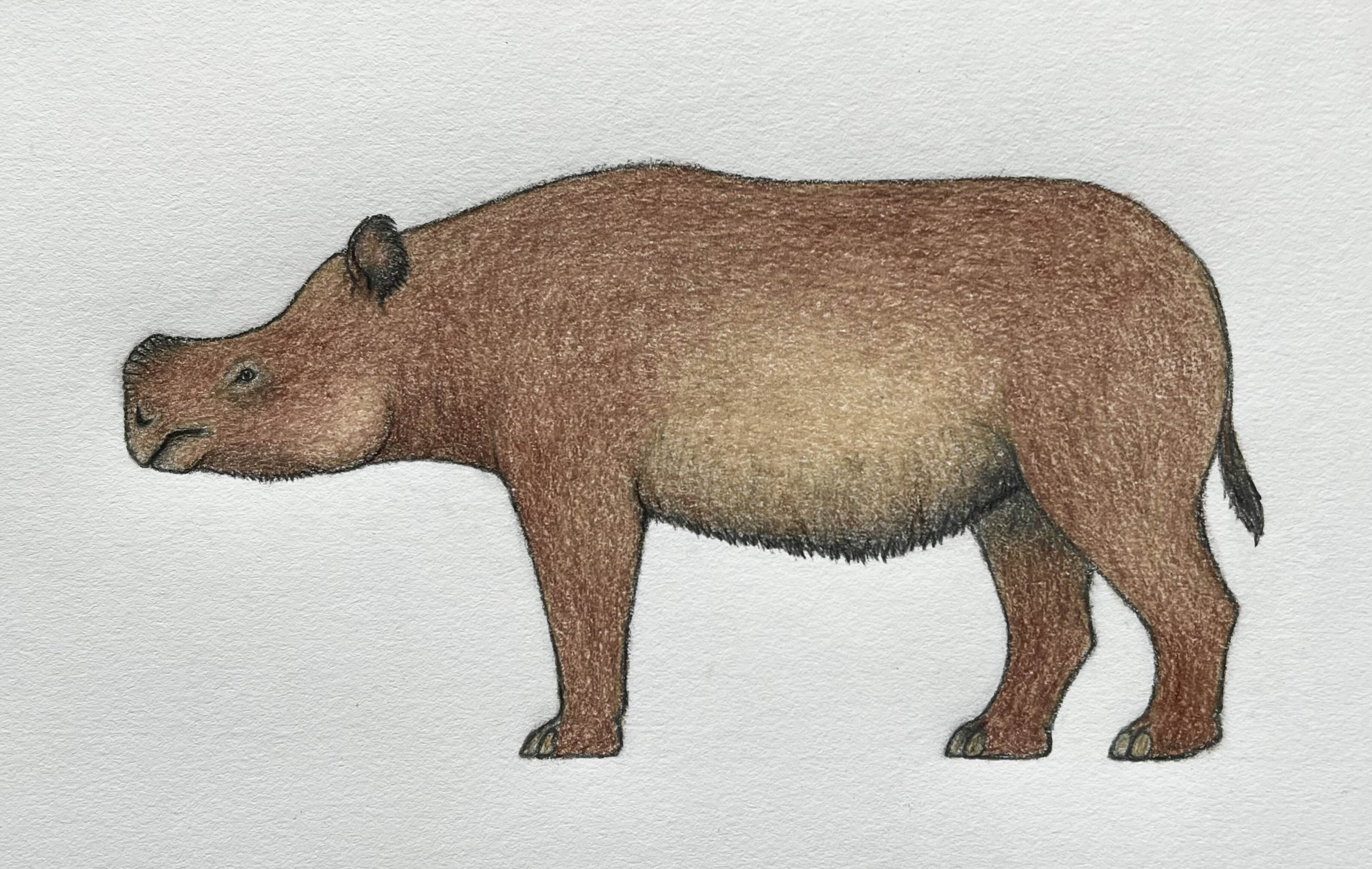
- Life restoration of V. kenyensis

Scientific classification
- Kingdom: Animalia
- Phylum: Chordata
- Class: Mammalia
- Order: Perissodactyla
- Family: Rhinocerotidae
- Subfamily: †Elasmotheriinae
- Genus: †Victoriaceros; Geraads, McCrossin & Benefit, 2012

Species
- Victoriaceros hooijeri Geraads et al., 2016; Victoriaceros kenyensis Geraads, McCrossin & Benefit, 2012

= Victoriaceros =

Victoriaceros Temporal range: Middle Miocene, 15 Ma

Extinct genus of mammals

Victoriaceros is an extinct genus of elasmotheriine rhinoceros known from the Miocene of Maboko Island, Kenya.

== Discovery ==
Victoriaceros is known from the holotype, an almost perfectly preserved skull, which characterized mainly by the large nasal horn, an orbit located very anteriorly and with a prominent border, and very broad zygomatic arches. Numerous limb bones, probably belonging to only a few individuals, are also known. Specimens of Victoriaceros were collected in the middle Miocene site of Maboko located in Lake Victoria in Kenya, from the Maboko beds, dating to about 15 million years ago. Victoriaceros represents the most common taxon in the Maboko beds, which has yielded one of the best collections of rhinoceroses in Africa. Teeth and skull morphology suggest that Victoriaceros belongs to subfamily Elasmotheriinae, whose might be not monophyletic. A second species, Victoriaceros hooijeri, was named in 2016 from the Kisiringi locality in Western Kenia.

== Etymology ==
Victoriaceros was first named by Denis Geraads, Monte McCrossin and Brenda Benefit in 2012 and the type species is Victoriaceros kenyensis. The generic name is derived from the name of Lake Victoria, and from Ancient Greek keras meaning "horn" thus, the name means "Lake Victoria's horn". The specific name refers to Kenya.
