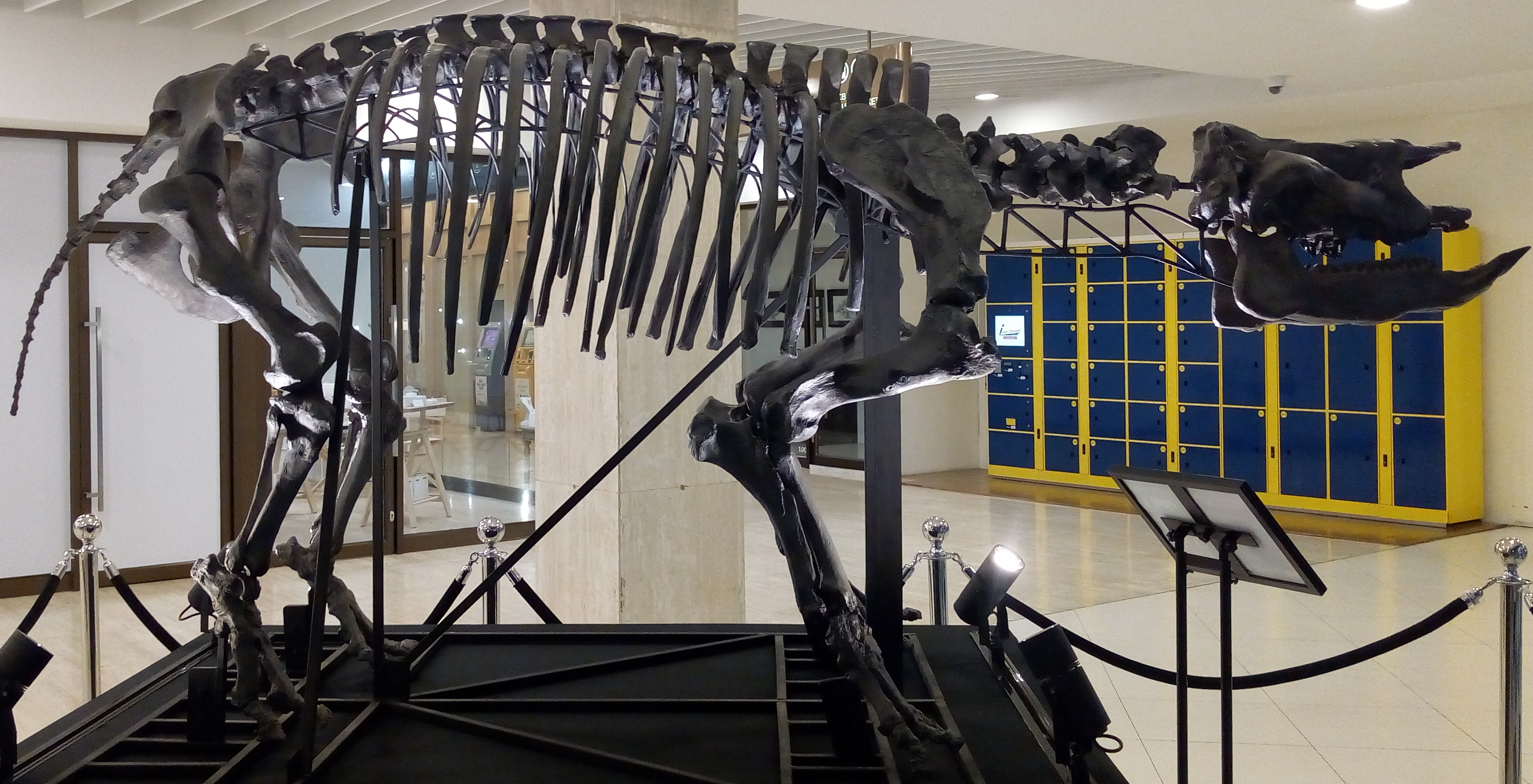
- Skeleton of Aceratherium (Aceratheriini)
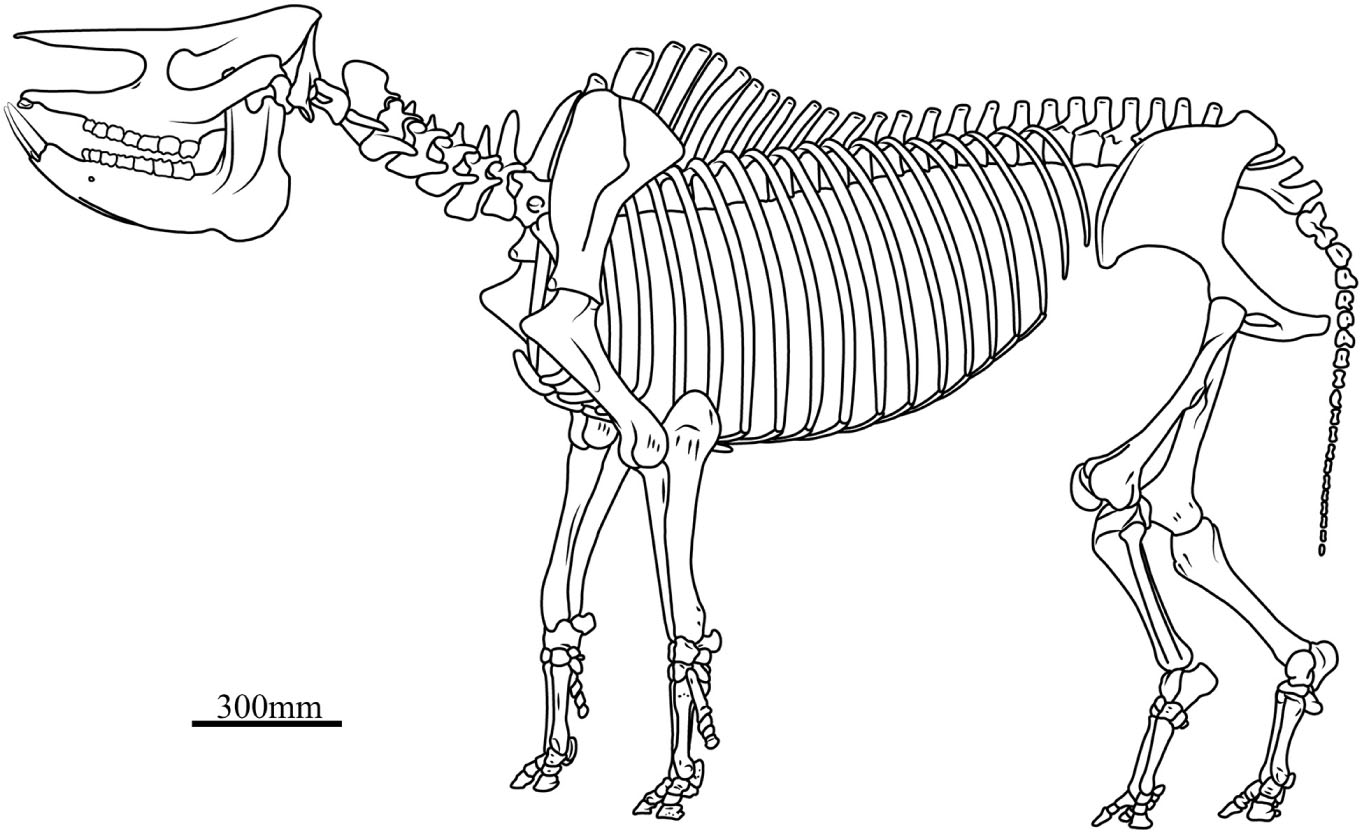
- Skeleton of Plesiaceratherium gracile (basal Aceratheriinae)

Scientific classification
- Kingdom: Animalia
- Phylum: Chordata
- Class: Mammalia
- Infraclass: Placentalia
- Order: Perissodactyla
- Family: Rhinocerotidae
- Subfamily: †Aceratheriinae; Dollo, 1885

Genera
- See Taxonomy

= Aceratheriinae =

Aceratheriinae Temporal range: Oligocene–Pliocene

Extinct subfamily of rhinoceroses

Aceratheriinae (from Ancient Greek ἀ- (á-), meaning "-less", κέρας (kéras), meaning "horn", and θηρίον (theríon), meaning "beast") is an extinct subfamily of true rhinoceroses (Rhinocerotidae) that ranged across Eurasia, Africa and North America from the Oligocene to the beginning of the Pliocene. Members of the group generally lacked horns, though some members of the family may have borne small horns.

The subfamily had historically been used as a wastebasket taxon for all hornless rhinocerotids, though it is now recognised that there are hornless non-aceratheriine rhinocerotids. Aceratheriinae as presently defined includes at least one tribe, Aceratheriini. It is disputed whether members of the tribe Teleoceratini also belong in Aceratheriinae or if they instead represent a distinct separate group of rhinoceroses.

== Description ==
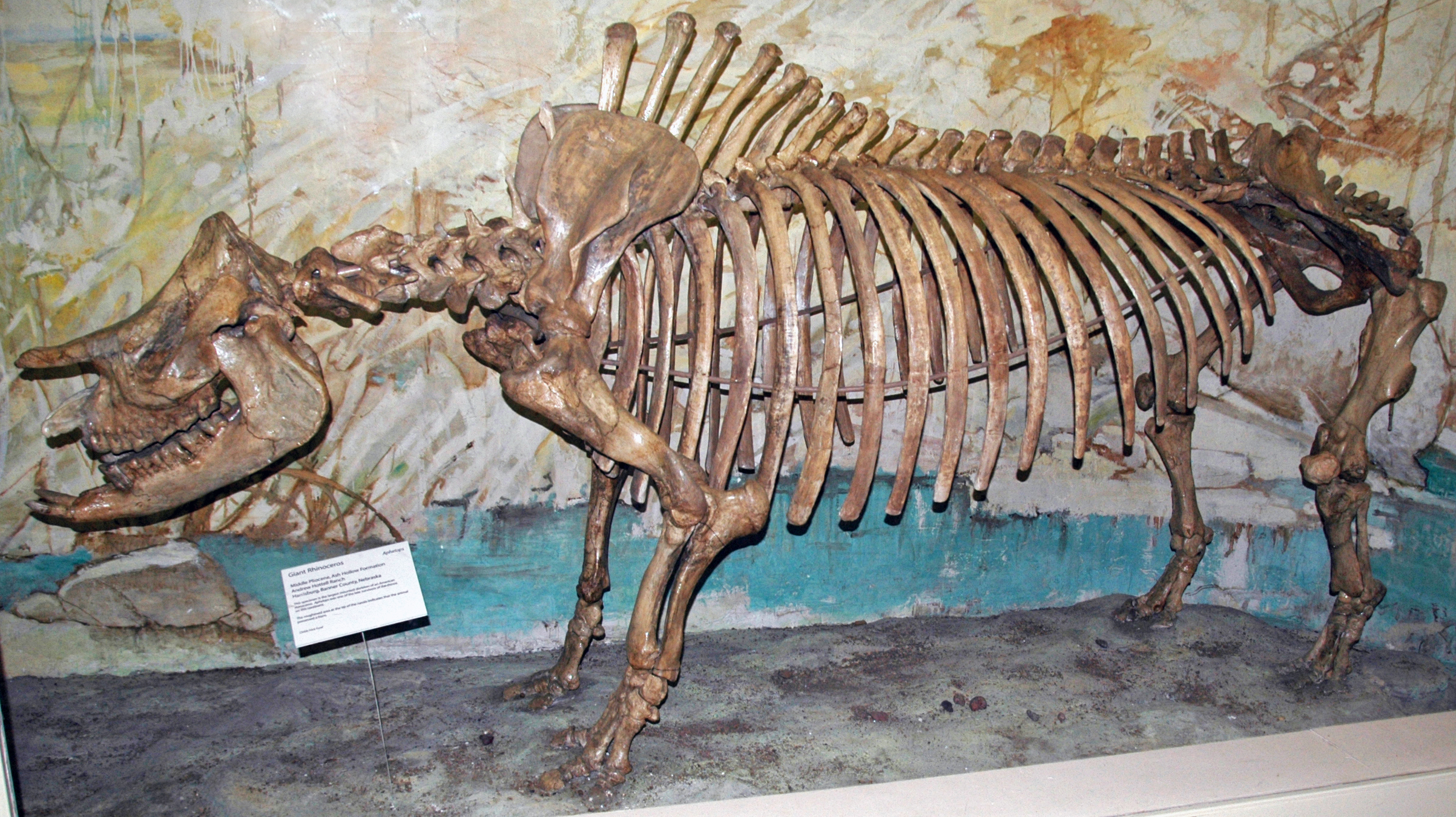
Skeleton of Aphelops

Compared to other members of Rhinocerotidae, members of Aceratheriinae are of medium to large size. They retained four functional digits (tetradactyly) on their forelimbs. Although most members of Aceratheriinae were hornless, some members possibly developed small nasal horns. Like many other rhinoceroses, they had deep nasal notches that extended back as far as the position of the third premolar or first molar tooth. The upper first incisors (I1) were retained by most aceratheriines, but were lost in some members, including members of Aceratheriini, while in members of Teleoceratini, the first upper incisors were considerably enlarged. The lower second incisors (i2) were enlarged, becoming tusk-like in members of Aceratheriini and Teleoceratini. The cheek teeth (premolars and molars) show a number of distinctive characters, including the labial cingula being reduced on both the upper and lower teeth, though the lingual cingulum of the upper teeth were always unreduced. The lingual cusp on the upper cheek teeth was variable and could either be expanded or constricted. Members of Aceratheriini and Teleoceratini had relatively short and broad skulls, but this was not true of other more basal aceratheriines, which tended to have proportionally narrower and more elongate skulls. Members of Aceratheriini and Teleoceratini had graviportal limbs to accommodate the massive, relatively short body possessed by members of these tribes.

== Ecology ==
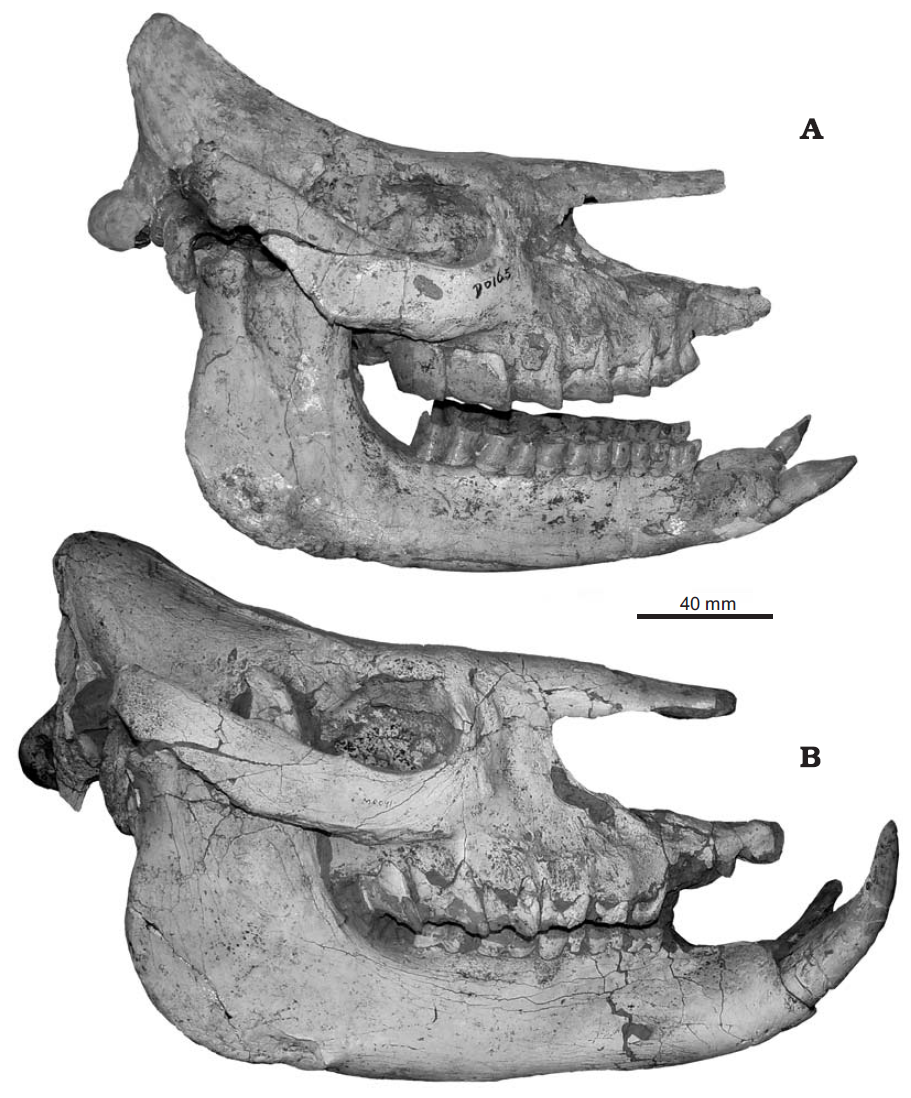
Skulls of female (above) and male (below) Chilotherium wimani (Aceratheriini), showing sexually dimorphic enlarged tusk-like lower incisors of males, which may have been used in combat between rival males.

Dental wear analysis suggests that some aceratheriines such as Protaceratherium were browsers on leaves, while others such as Mesaceratherium and the aceratheriin Chilotherium were mixed feeders, consuming both leaves and grass. It has been controversially suggested that due to their short limbs, members of the tribe Teleoceratini, especially Teleoceras, were-semi aquatic, with an ecology similar to hippopotamuses. Analysis of oxygen isotope ratios (which differ in the bones of semi-aquatic animals and terrestrial animals), have provided conflicting evidence both supporting and opposing a semi-aquatic lifestyle for Teleoceras. At least some aceratheriines are suggested to have had a polygynous mating system, like living rhinoceroses, with aceratheriines where males had enlarged tusk-like lower incisors such as Chilotherium suggested to have used them in combat against other males.

== Evolutionary history ==
The earliest records of Aceratheriine date to the Oligocene epoch. The subfamily exhibited great diversity during most of the Miocene epoch, though they declined towards the end of the period. The youngest record of the group is Shansirhinus ringstroemi, known from the Early Pliocene of China.

== Taxonomy ==
Aceratheriinae was named by Louis Dollo in 1885. It was assigned to Rhinocerotida by Codrea (1992); and to Rhinocerotidae by Prothero (1998), Antoine et al. (2000), Kaya and Heissig (2001), Sach and Heizmann (2001) and Deng (2005).

Historically, the subfamily Aceratheriinae has been used as a wastebasket taxon to include all hornless rhinocerotids, but it now recognised that not all hornless rhinocerotids are aceratheriines. The relationship of Aceratheriinae to the two other major subfamilies of Rhinocerotidae, Rhinocerotinae (which contains modern rhinoceroses) and Elasmotheriinae, is disputed. Some studies have recovered Elasmotheriinae and Rhinocerotinae as more closely related to each other than they are to Aceratheriinae, while other authors have contended that Aceratheriinae is more closely related to Rhinocerotinae than to Elasmotheriinae, sometimes treating it as a subgroup of Rhinocerotinae as the clade Aceratheriina. The number of genera that should be included in Aceratheriinae remains the subject of dispute. In particular, whether or not Teleoceratini represents a subgroup of Aceratheriinae, or represents a distinct separate group, at least sometimes considered more closely related to modern rhinocerotines, is the subject of disagreement.

Cladogram of Rhinocerotidae showing placement of Aceratheriinae in relationship to other rhinoceroses after Lu, Deng & Pandolfi, 2023.

- Rhinocerotidae
  - †Trigonias
  - - †Ronzotherium
    - - †Epiaceratherium
      - - - †Molassitherium
          - †Skinneroceras
        - - †Aceratheriinae (including Teleoceratini)
          - - †Protaceratherium
            - - †Diceratherium
              - - †Menoceras
                - - Rhinocerotinae (modern rhinoceroses)
                  - †Elasmotheriinae

Cladogram of Aceratheriinae after Lu, Deng & Pandolfi, 2023:

- Aceratheriinae
  - - Mesaceratherium
    - Aprotodon
  - - Floridaceras
    - - - Galushaceras
        - - Plesiaceratherium
          - Chilotheridium
      - - - Persiatherium
          - Dromoceratherium
        - - - Hoploaceratherium
            - - Aphelops
              - Acerorhinus
          - - Diaceratherium
            - Alicornops
            - - Teleoceratini
                - Prosantorhinus
                - - Brachypotherium
                  - Teleoceras
              - Aceratheriini
                - Subchilotherium
                - - Aceratherium
                  - - Peraceras
                    - - Sansirhinus
                      - Chilotherium

Cladogram after Borrani et al. 2025, who divided the traditional Aceratheriinae into Aceratheriinae (sensu Borrani et al. 2025) and Teleoceratinae.

- Teleoceratinae
  - - Floridaceras
    - Diaceratherium
  - - - Shansirhinus
      - Chilotherium+ Chilotheridium
    - - Aprotodon+Brachypotherium
      - - Prosantorhinus
        - Teleoceras
- Aceratheriinae
  - - Dromoceratherium
    - Hoploaceratherium
  - - Plesiaceratherium + Peraceras hessei and Peraceras profectum
    - - - Subchilotherium
        - Turkanatherium?
      - - Acerorhinus
        - - Aceratherium + Aphelops mutilus
          - - Alicornops
            - - Aphelops malacorinus
              - - Aphelops megalodus
                - Peraceras supercilosum

=== Tribes and genera ===
The following genera are recognized as valid:

- Alicornops
- Aprotodon
- Acerorhinus
- Aphelops
- Hoploaceratherium
- Persiatherium
- Brachydiceratherium
- Diaceratherium
- Dromoceratherium
- Floridaceras
- Galushaceras
- Chilotheridium
- Mesaceratherium
- Plesiaceratherium
- Proaceratherium
- Aceratheriini
  - Acerorhinus?
  - Aphelops?
  - Hoploaceratherium?
  - Persiatherium?
  - Aceratherium
  - Subchilotherium
  - Peraceras
  - Chilotherium
  - Shansirhinus
  - Turkanatherium
- Teleoceratini?
  - Alicornops?
  - Teleoceras
  - Brachypotherium
  - Prosantorhinus
