= Brachydiceratherium =

Brachydiceratherium Temporal range: Oligocene-Miocene

Scientific classification
- Kingdom: Animalia
- Phylum: Chordata
- Class: Mammalia
- Order: Perissodactyla
- Family: Rhinocerotidae
- Subfamily: †Aceratheriinae
- Tribe: †Teleoceratini
- Genus: †Brachydiceratherium; Lavocat, 1952

Species
- See text.

Synonyms
- Diaceratherium Dietrich, 1931; Brachypotherium Roger, 1904 (pro parte)

Brachydiceratherium, from Ancient Greek βραχύς (brakhús), meaning "short", δίς (dís), meaning "two", κέρας (kéras), meaning "horn", and θηρίον (theríon), meaning "beast", is an extinct genus of aceratheriine rhinocerotid that inhabited Eurasia during the Oligocene and Miocene epochs.

== Taxonomy ==
The genus Brachydiceratherium was first described by R. Lavocat. The Paleobiology Database and related sources give the year as 1952; other sources have 1951. Alternatively, the genus may not be separated from Diaceratherium, which in turn may be treated as the subgenus Diaceratherium of the genus Brachypotherium. Species that have been placed in Brachydiceratherium include:

- Brachydiceratherium aginense, syn. Diaceratherium aginense (Repelin, 1917)
- Brachydiceratherium aurelianense, syn. Diaceratherium aurelianense (Nouel, 1866)
- Brachydiceratherium lamilloquense, syn. Diaceratherium lamilloquense Michel, 1983
- Brachydiceratherium lemanense, syn. Diaceratherium lemanense (Pomel, 1853)

== Palaeoecology ==
B. lamilloquense was a browser that mainly fed on soft vegetation. B. lemanense was likewise a browser, though at some sites, its dental wear patterns are consistent with mixed feeding.
