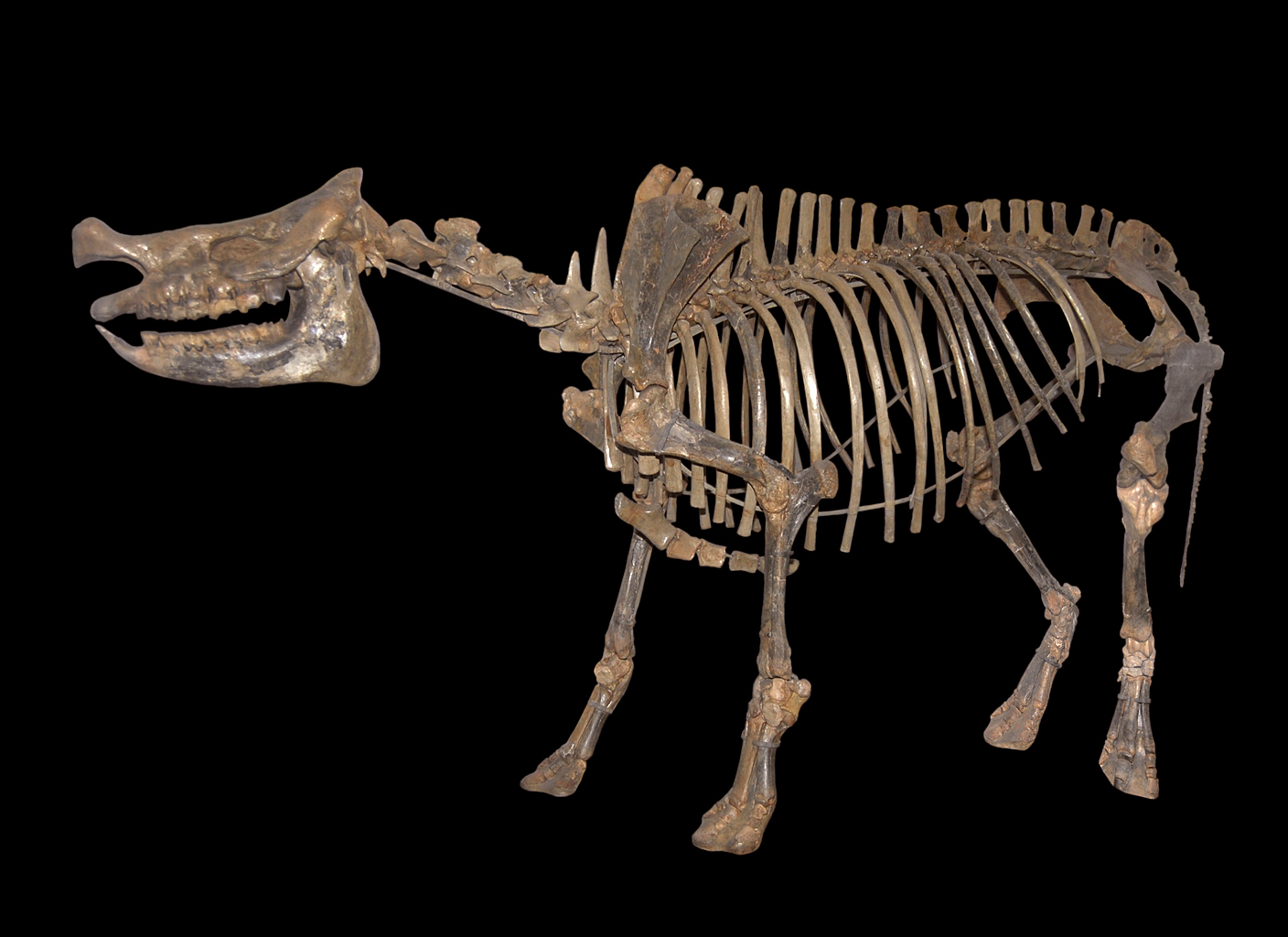
- Skeleton, Natural History Museum, London

Scientific classification
- Kingdom: Animalia
- Phylum: Chordata
- Class: Mammalia
- Order: Perissodactyla
- Family: Rhinocerotidae
- Subfamily: †Elasmotheriinae
- Genus: †Diceratherium; Marsh, 1875

Type species
- Diceratherium armatum Marsh, 1875

Species
- D. matutinum Marsh, 1870; D. annectens Marsh, 1873; D. armatum Marsh, 1875; D. tridactylum Marsh, 1893; D. niobrarense Peterson, 1906

= Diceratherium =

Diceratherium Temporal range: Late Oligocene to Miocene, 33.9–11.6 Ma

Extinct genus of mammal

Diceratherium (meaning "two horned beast") is an extinct genus of rhinocerotid native to North America during the Oligocene through Miocene living from 33.9 to 11.6 mya, existing for approximately 22.3 million years. Mass estimates for the type species, D. armatum average around 1 t (2,200 lb)

== Taxonomy ==
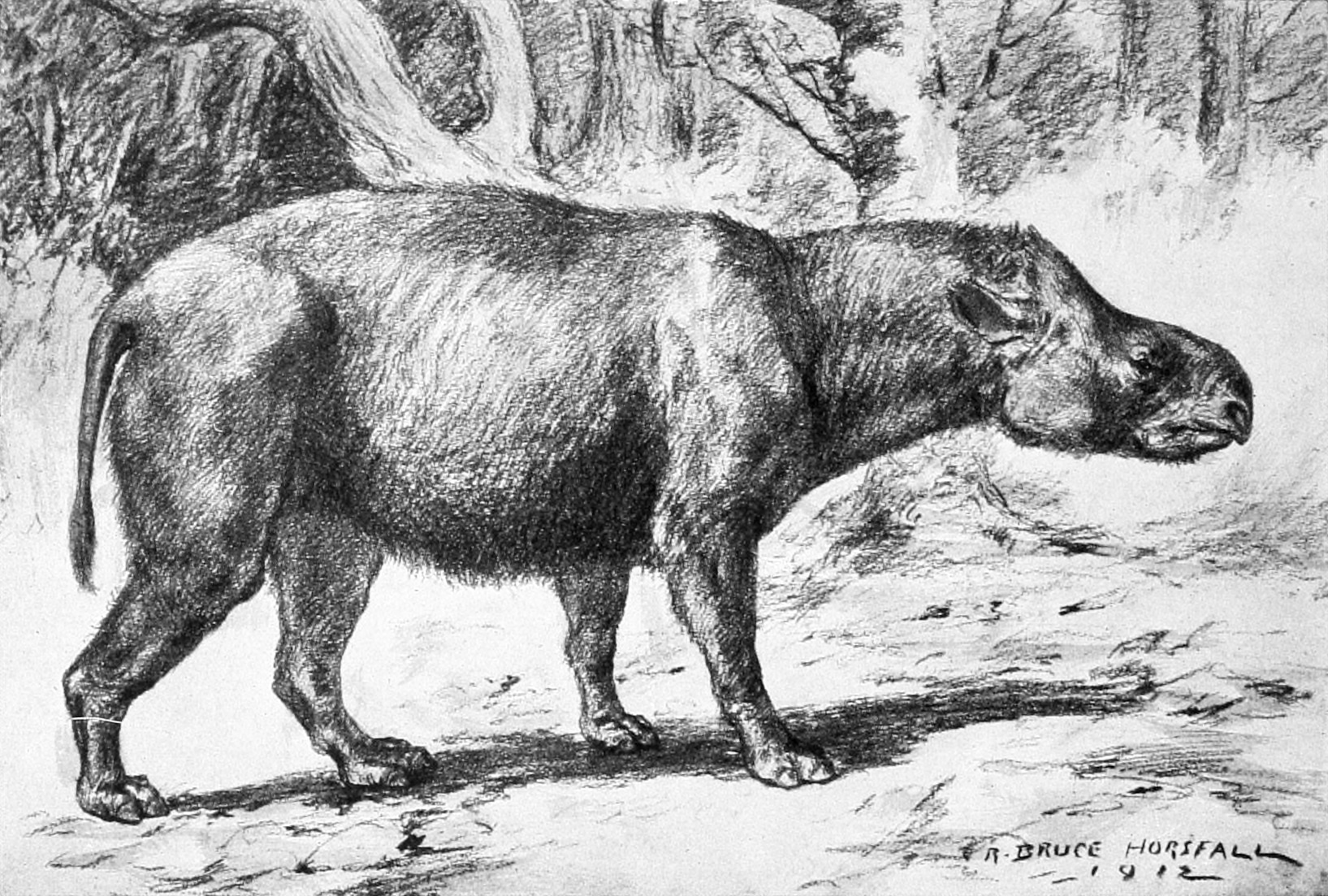
Restoration of D. tridactylum

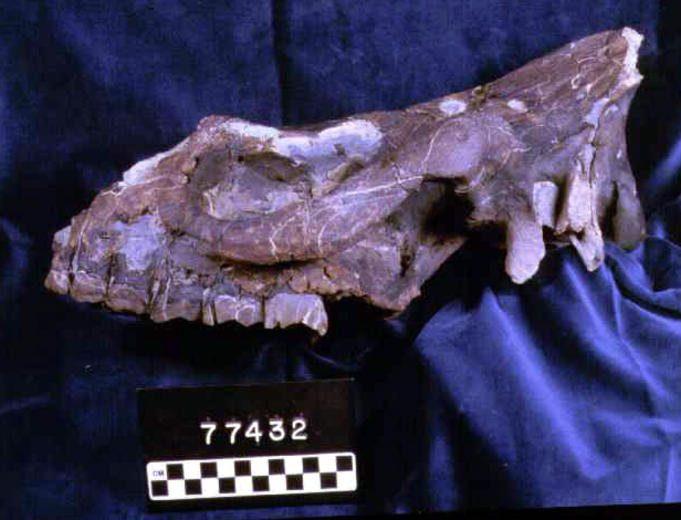
Skull, University of California Museum of Paleontology

Diceratherium was named by Marsh (1875) based on the type species Diceratherium armatum. It was assigned to Rhinocerotidae by Marsh (1875) and Carroll (1988); to Diceratheriinae by Prothero (1998); to Aceratheriinae by Weidmann and Ginsburg (1999); and to Teleoceratini by Sach and Heizmann (2001).

== Description ==
Diceratherium had two horns side by side on its nose, which has often led it to be confused with Menoceras. This forked horn was a sexually dimorphic feature in Diceratherium and its relatives.

== "Blue Lake rhino" ==
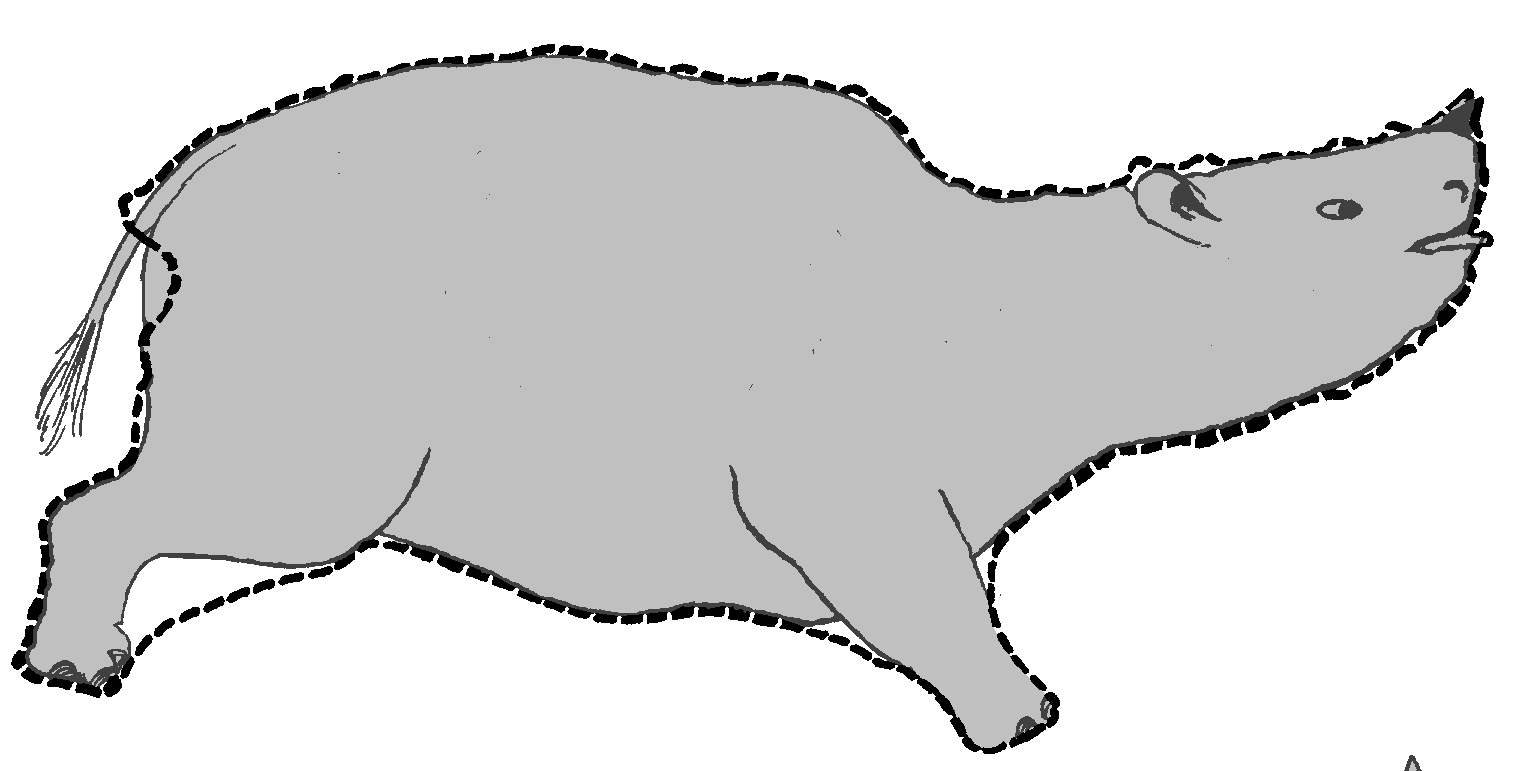
Illustration of the "Blue Lake rhino"

A full-body mold of a Diceratherium exists as an impression in a cliff on the shore of Blue Lake near Coulee City, Washington. The impression is a lava cast that is thought to be of a mature individual that died in a shallow lake and was rapidly buried by a basalt flow during the mid-Miocene (about 15 million years ago), creating a three-dimensional mold of its body. The mold formed a rhinoceros-shaped cave on exposed rocks belonging to the Columbia River Basalt Group, which was first discovered by two Seattle couples searching for petrified wood in 1935, who also discovered remnant bones of the animal. A replica of the "rhinoceros cave" was created by researchers from the University of California Museum of Paleontology in 1948 and later donated to the Burke Museum, where it is on display.
