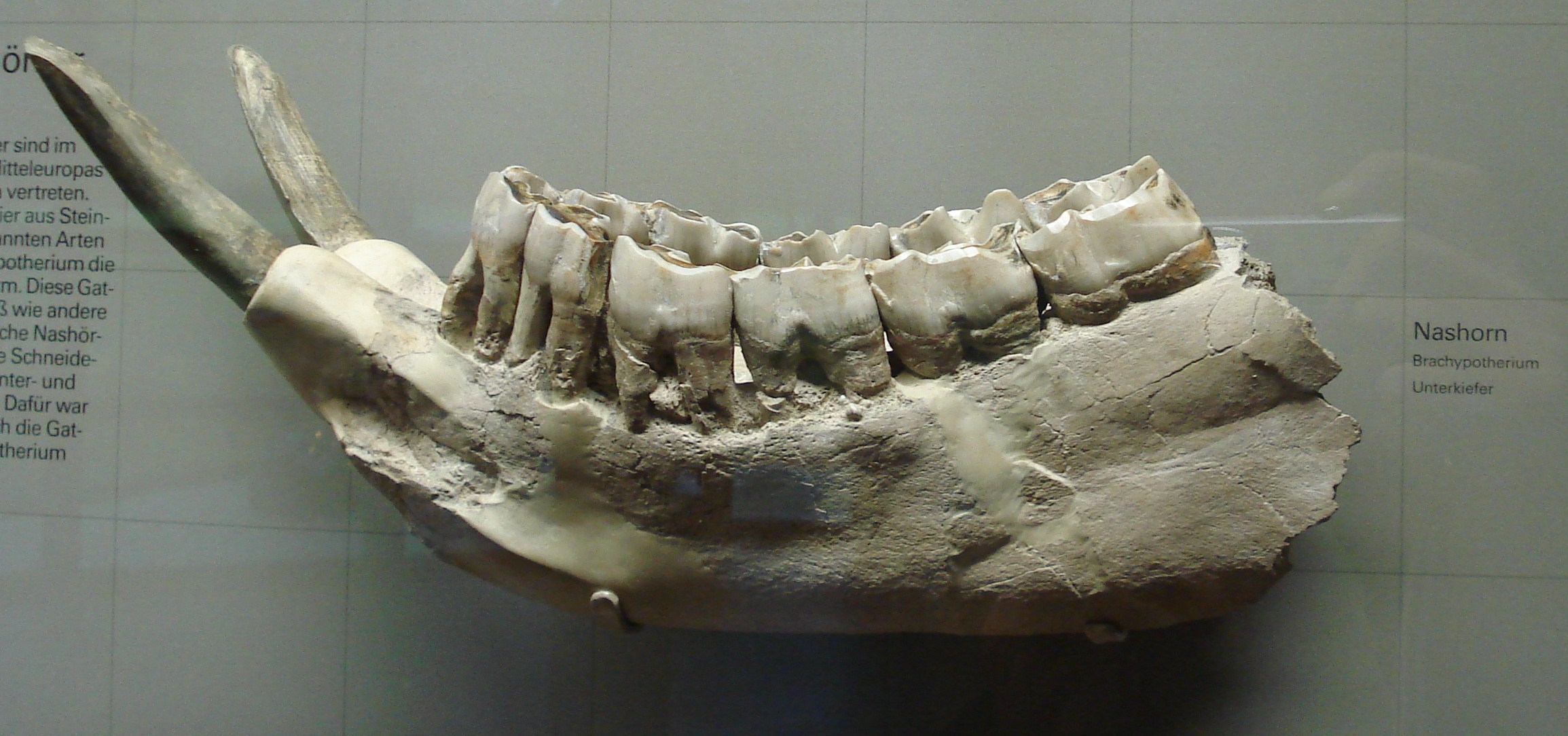
- Mandible

Scientific classification
- Kingdom: Animalia
- Phylum: Chordata
- Class: Mammalia
- Order: Perissodactyla
- Family: Rhinocerotidae
- Subfamily: †Aceratheriinae
- Tribe: †Teleoceratini
- Genus: †Brachypotherium; Roger, 1904

Type species
- †Brachypotherium brachypus Lartet, 1848

Species
- B. brachypus; B. fatehjangense; B. goldfussi; B. lewisi; B. minor; B. perimense

= Brachypotherium =

Brachypotherium Temporal range: Miocene

Extinct genus of rhinoceros

Brachypotherium is an extinct genus of rhinocerotid that lived in Eurasia and Africa during the Miocene.

Many species of Brachypotherium have been described. Some species have moved to other genera, such as B. aurelianense being transferred to Diaceratherium. The genus was widespread during the Early and Middle Miocene, before heading into a decline. They went extinct in Eurasia by the beginning of the Late Miocene, with the African species B. lewisi surviving until the end of the epoch.

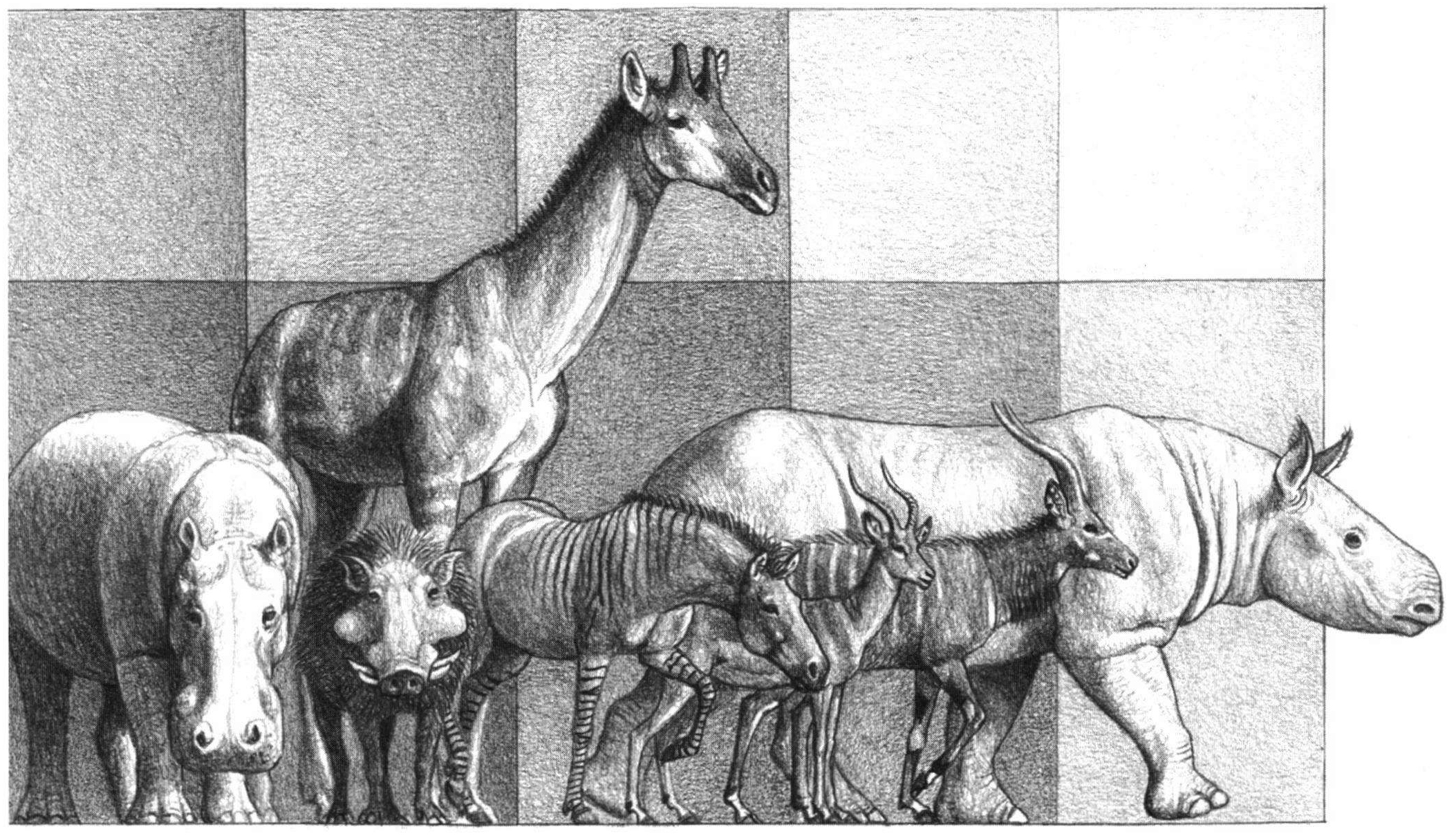
Ungulates from the Late Miocene of Africa, including B. lewisi (right)

A first upper deciduous molar referable to Brachypotherium brachypus was found during gold mining in New Caledonia during the 19th century, being misidentified as a species of marsupial known as Zygomaturus. However, rhinoceros were never native to New Caledonia, and the tooth likely originates from France and was probably used as jewelry by a French convict deported there.

== Paleoecology ==
Dental microwear and mesowear analysis of fossils from Béon 1 suggests that B. brachypus was a mixed feeder. Paired δ^{18}O and δ^{13}C data from Middle Miocene fossils found in the Siwaliks of Pakistan indicate that B. perimense dwelt in ponds and woodlands, while B. fatehjangense preferred forests with river systems.
