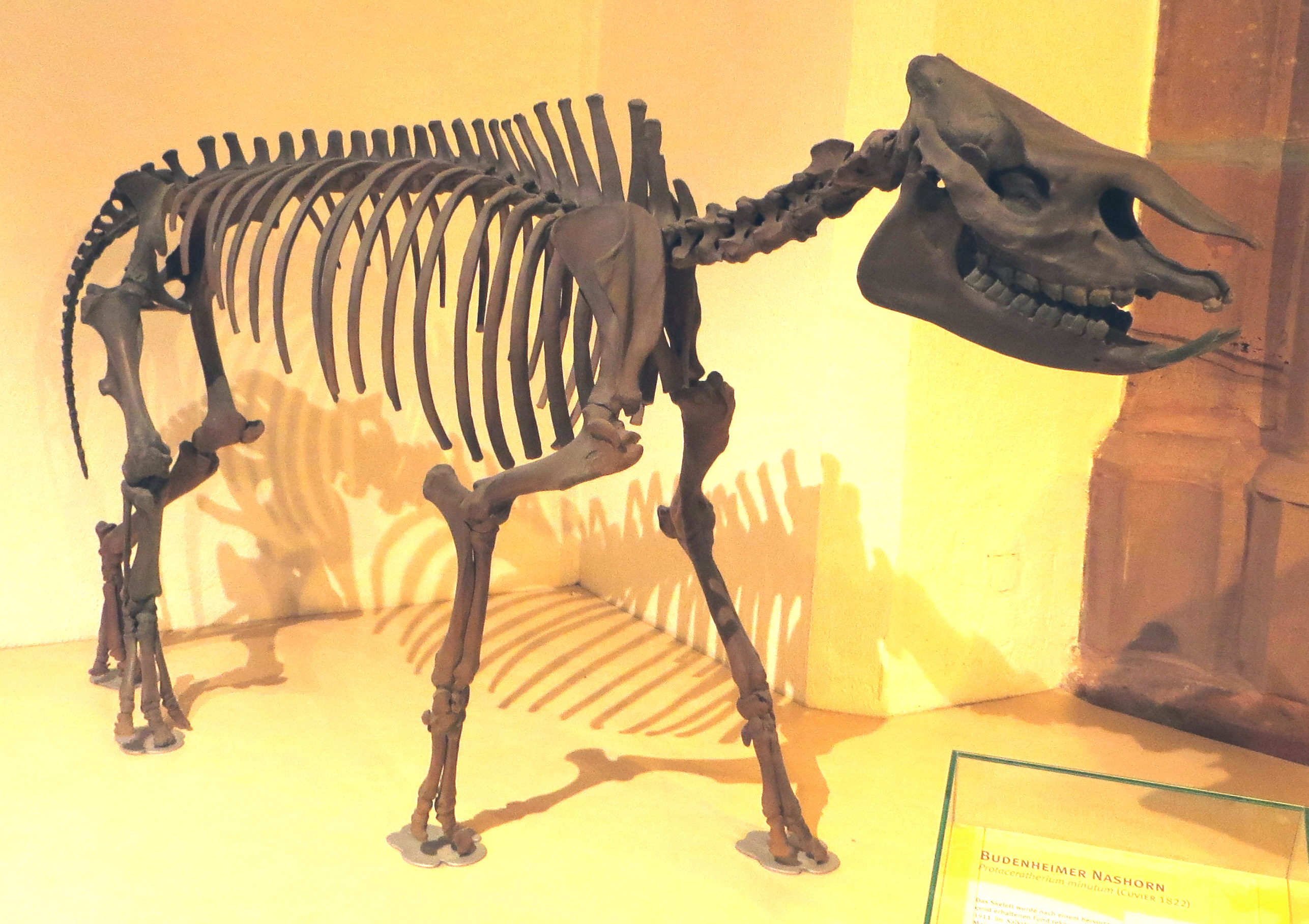
- P. minutum skeleton

Scientific classification
- Kingdom: Animalia
- Phylum: Chordata
- Class: Mammalia
- Order: Perissodactyla
- Family: Rhinocerotidae
- Genus: †Protaceratherium; Abel, 1910

Species
- Protaceratherium albigense; Protaceratherium minutum

= Protaceratherium =

Protaceratherium Temporal range: Late Oligocene - Early Miocene

Extinct genus of mammal

Protaceratherium is an extinct genus of rhinocerotid from the Oligocene and Miocene of Eurasia.

It was a primitive, lightly built rhinoceros that was adapted to running.

Jaw

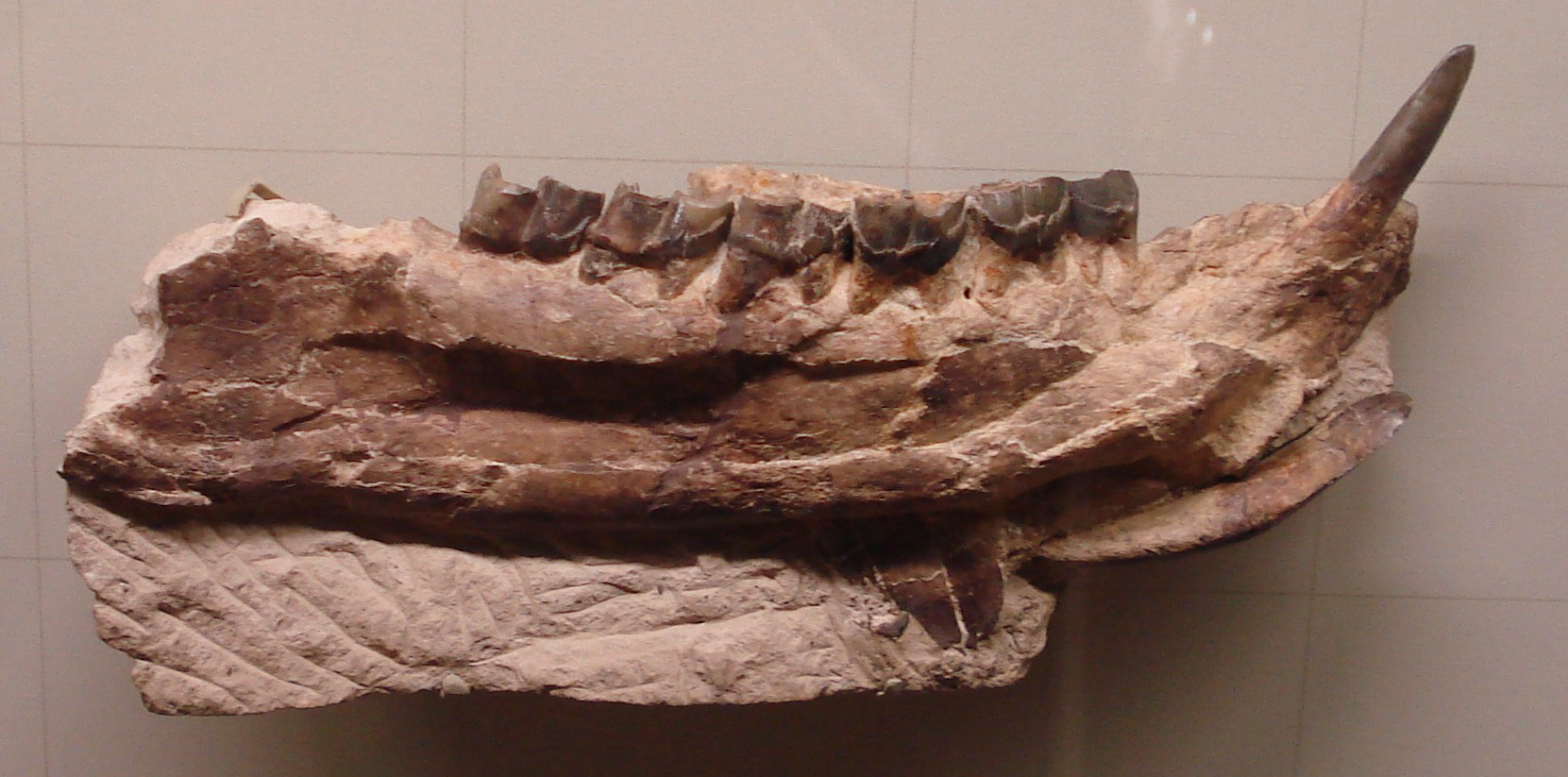
Jaw

== Palaeoecology ==
Analysis of dental δ^{13}C values combined with dental mesowear and microwear show that P. minutum fed primarily on C_{3} plants and that it consumed less abrasive plants than the contemporary Mesaceratherium paulhiacense.
