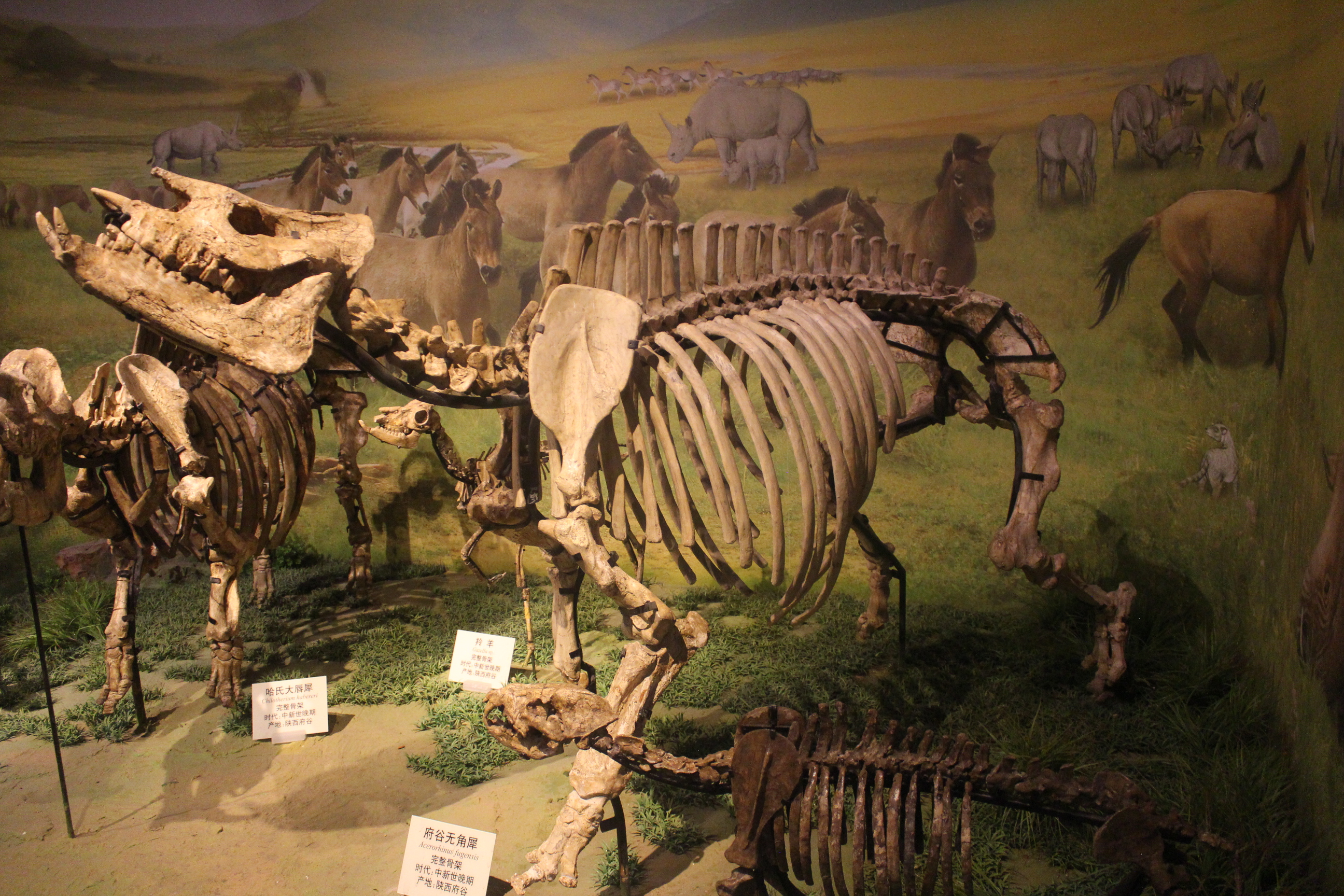
- Skeletal mount, Tianjin Natural History Museum

Scientific classification
- Kingdom: Animalia
- Phylum: Chordata
- Class: Mammalia
- Order: Perissodactyla
- Family: Rhinocerotidae
- Subfamily: †Aceratheriinae
- Genus: †Acerorhinus; Kretzoi, 1942

Type species
- †Acerorhinus zernowi Borissiak, 1914

Species
- A. fuguensis; A. hezhegensis; A. hipparionum; A. neleus; A. palaeosinensis; A. simplex; A. tsaidamensis; A. zernowi

= Acerorhinus =

Acerorhinus Temporal range: Serravallian-Messinian, 13.6–7.0 Ma

Extinct genus of mammals

Acerorhinus, from Ancient Greek ἀ- (á-), meaning "-less", κέρας (kéras), meaning "horn", and ῥίς (rhís), meaning "nose", is an extinct genus of rhinocerotid of the subfamily Aceratheriinae endemic to Asia from the Miocene, living from 13.6 to 7.0 mya existing for approximately 6.6 million years.

Among other locations, well-preserved Acerorhinus skull specimens have been found at Kerassiá in North Eubonea, Greece.

== Taxonomy ==
Acerorhinus was named by Kretzoi (1942). Its type is Aceratherium zernowi. Originally, many species in this genus including A. zernowi were assigned to Chilotherium. It was assigned to Aceratheriini by Kaya and Heissig (2001); and to Aceratheriini by Antoine and Saraç (2005).

== Description ==
Acerorhinus had very short legs, more like Teleoceras than other Aceratherines. While most other Aceratherines were grazers, Acerorhinus had brachyodont teeth which indicate a preferences for browsing.

Like other Aceratherines, it was hornless and had tusk-like incisors.
