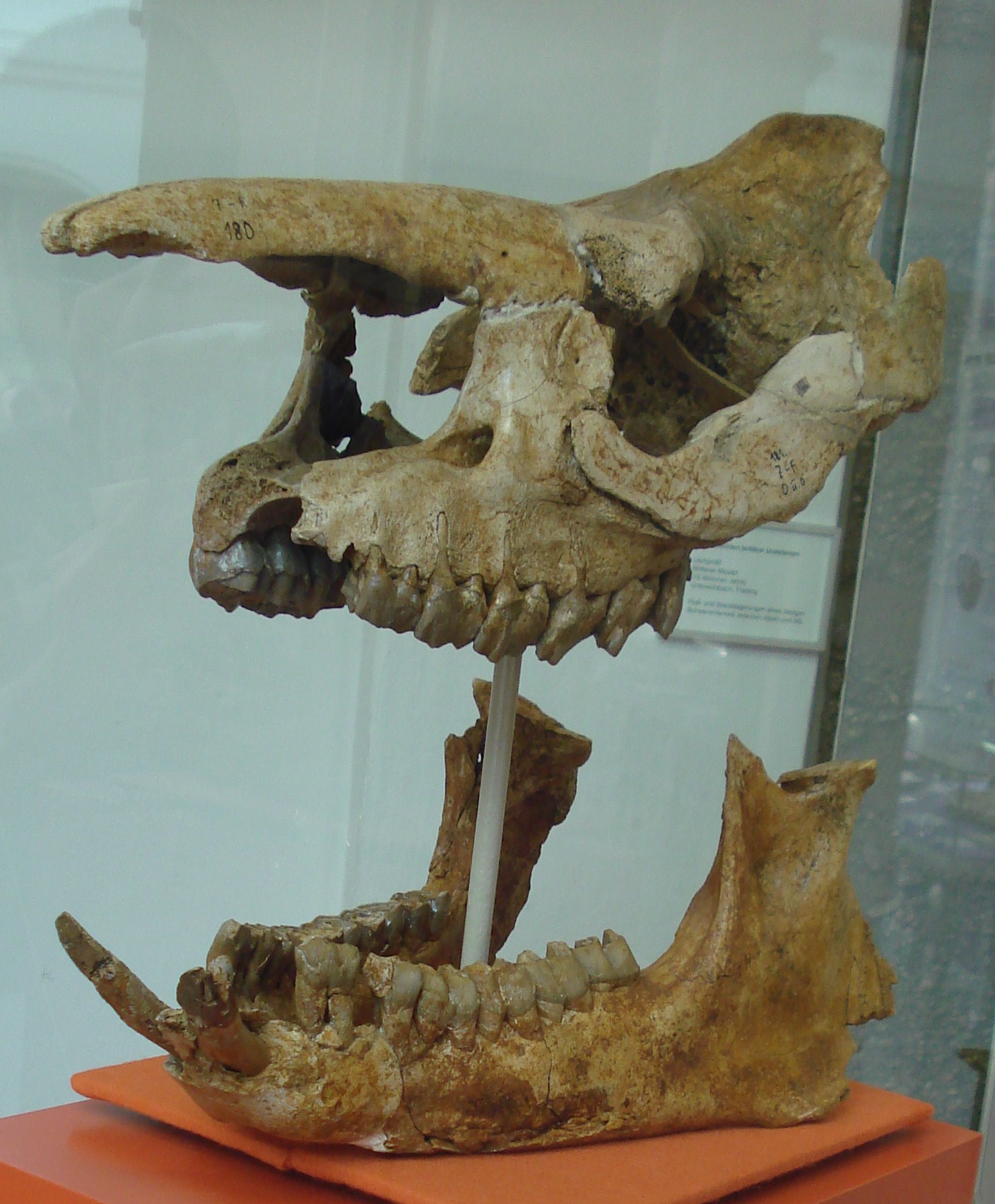
- Plesiaceratherium skull, Paläontologische Museum München
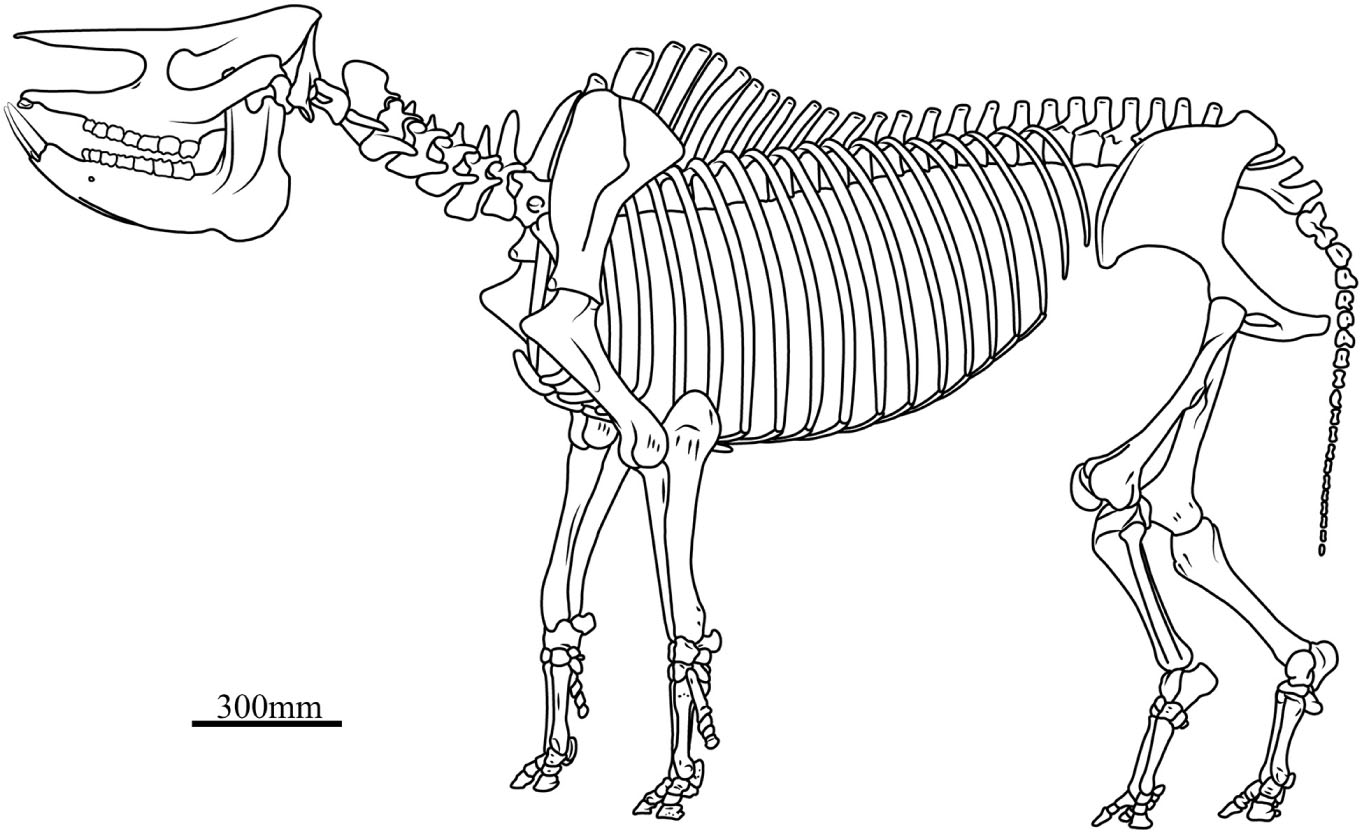
- P. gracile skeletal reconstruction.

Scientific classification
- Domain: Eukaryota
- Kingdom: Animalia
- Phylum: Chordata
- Class: Mammalia
- Order: Perissodactyla
- Family: Rhinocerotidae
- Subfamily: †Aceratheriinae
- Genus: †Plesiaceratherium; Young, 1937

Species
- Plesiaceratherium gracile; Plesiaceratherium mirallesi; Plesiaceratherium tongxinense

= Plesiaceratherium =

Extinct genus of mammals

Plesiaceratherium is an extinct genus of rhinocerotids. It includes two species: P. gracile from China and P. mirallesi from France.

Plesiaceratherium gracile was a mid-sized, hornless species of rhinoceros. Estimated size is 2.8–3.1 m (9.2–10.2 ft) in head-body length, 1.4–1.6 m (4.6–5.2 ft) in shoulder height, and 1,198 kg (2,641 lb) in weight. Males had significantly larger incisors than females and had more robust heads and bodies (although females may have had longer heads and limbs), and combined with their large body size it suggests that this species was polygynous and had a solitary lifestyle.

Sexual Dimorphism

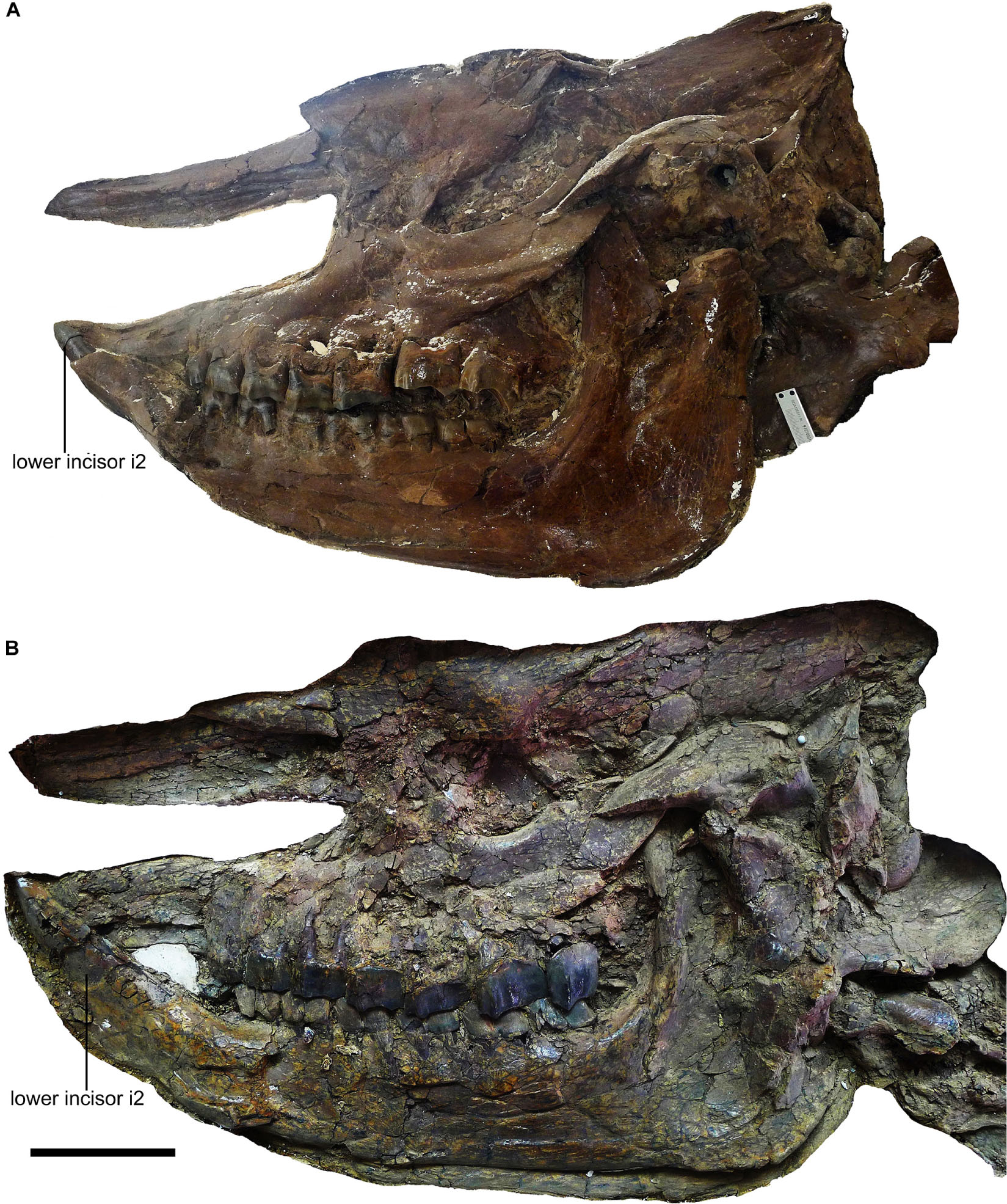
Skulls: female (A), male (B).

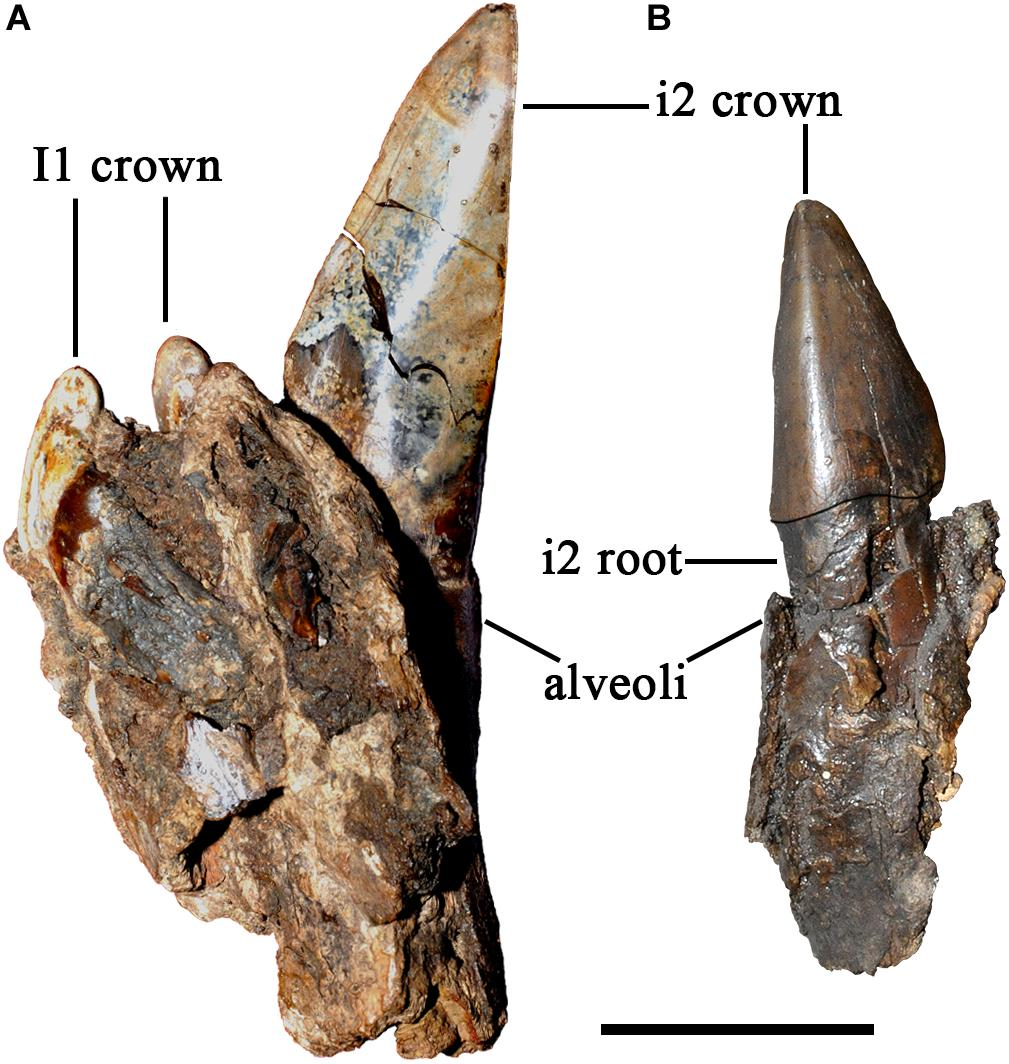
Incisors: male (A), female (B).

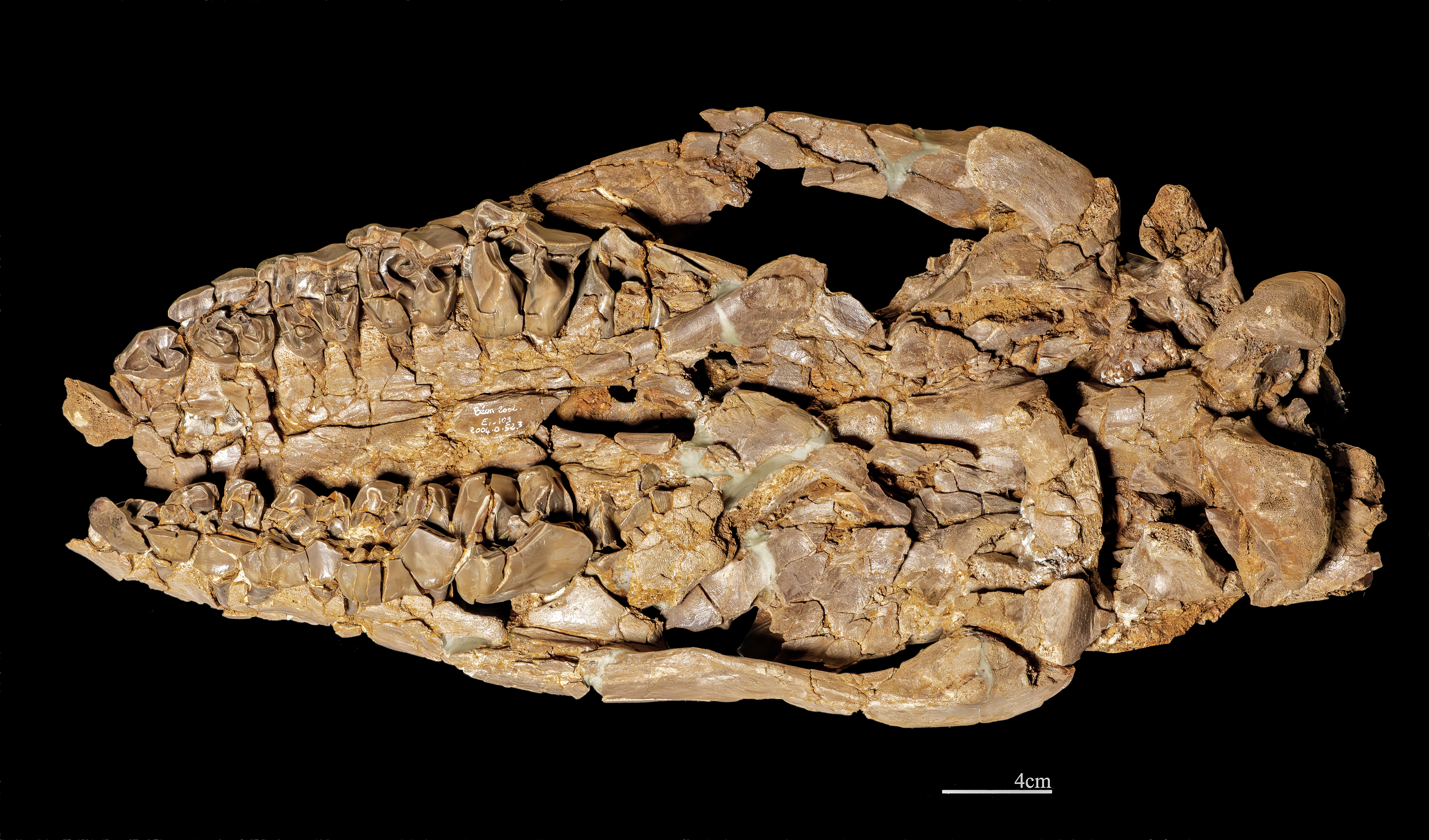
Plesiaceratherium mirallesi Skull (Béon, Montréal-du-Gers, France) MHNT

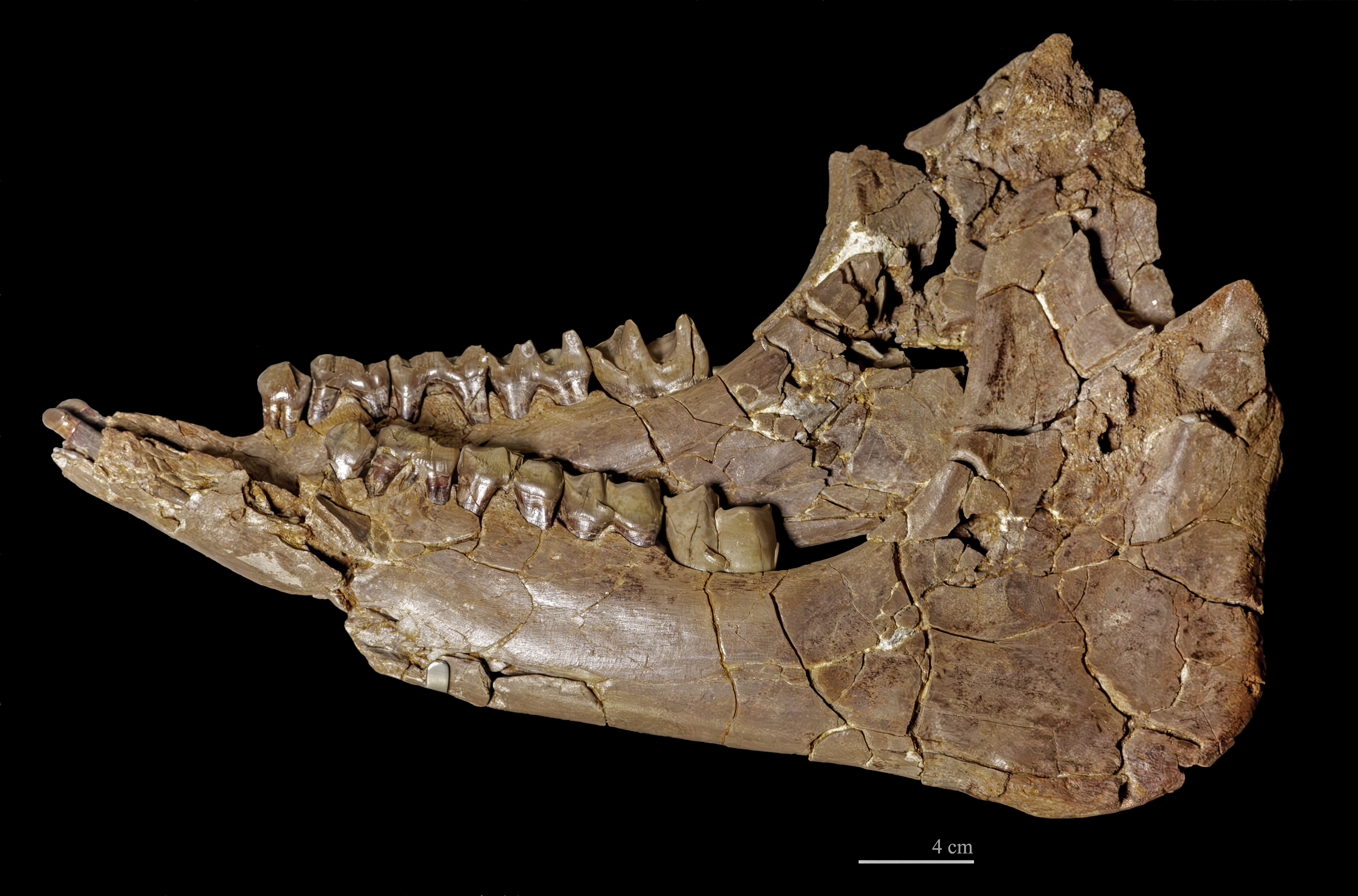
Plesiaceratherium mirallesi Mandibule (Béon, Montréal-du-Gers, France) MHNT

== Palaeoecology ==
P. mirallesi was a browser whose diet was primarily composed of leaves.
