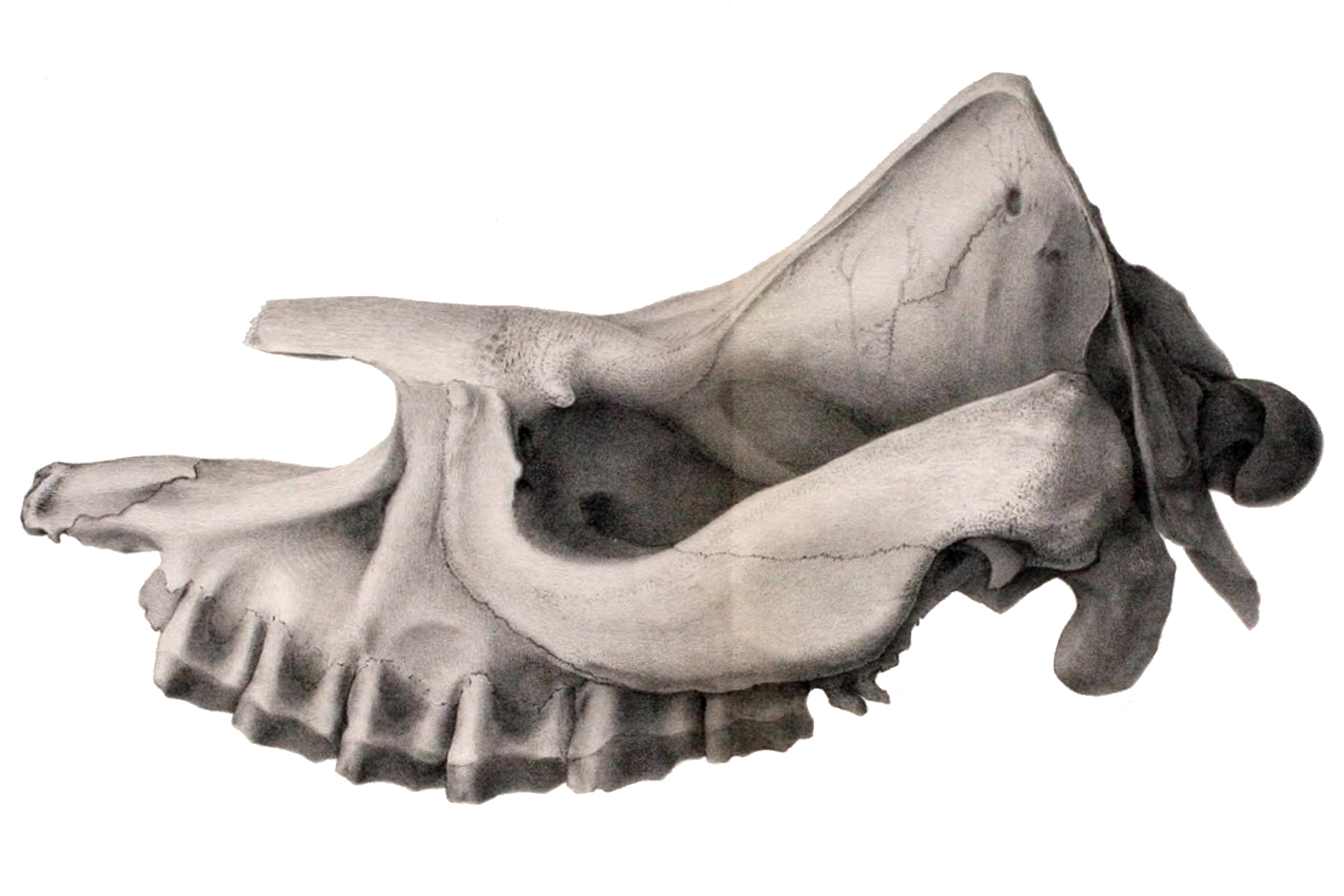
- Peraceras superciliosus

Scientific classification
- Kingdom: Animalia
- Phylum: Chordata
- Class: Mammalia
- Order: Perissodactyla
- Family: Rhinocerotidae
- Subfamily: †Aceratheriinae
- Genus: †Peraceras; Cope, 1880

Species
- See text

= Peraceras =

Peraceras Temporal range: Middle Miocene

Extinct genus of rhinoceros

Peraceras is an extinct genus of rhinocerotids endemic to North America. It lived during the Miocene, living from 16.0 to 10.3 mya, existing for approximately 6 million years.

== Species ==
- Peraceras hessei Prothero & Manning 1987
- Peraceras profectum Matthew 1899
- Peraceras superciliosus Cope 1880
