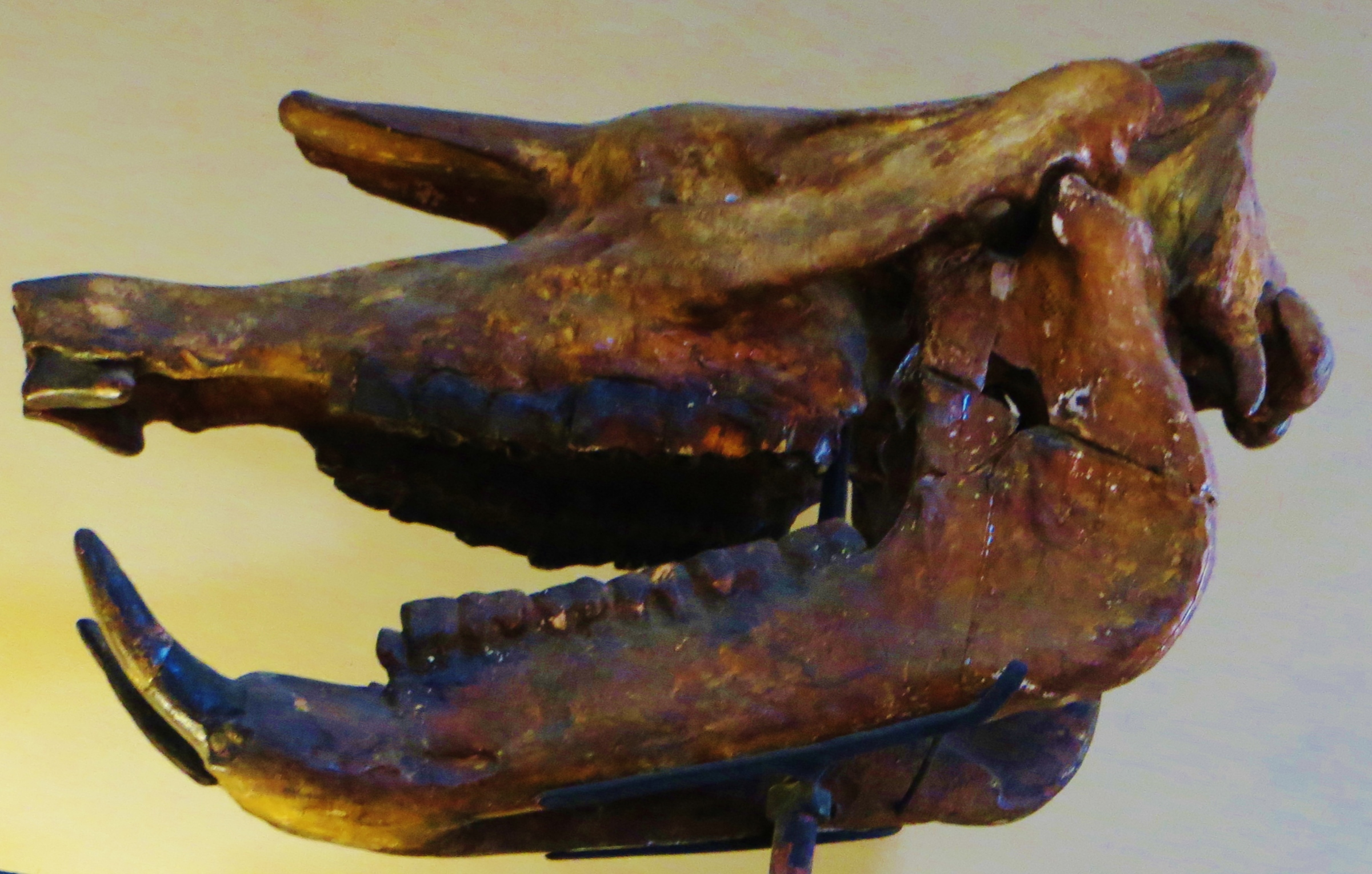
- A. incisivum skull at the Gallery of Paleontology and Comparative Anatomy, Paris.

Scientific classification
- Kingdom: Animalia
- Phylum: Chordata
- Class: Mammalia
- Infraclass: Placentalia
- Order: Perissodactyla
- Family: Rhinocerotidae
- Subfamily: †Aceratheriinae
- Genus: †Aceratherium; Kaup, 1832

Type species
- †Aceratherium incisivum Cuvier, 1822

Species
- A. depereti Borissiak, 1927; A. incisivum; A. porpani Deng, Hanta & Jintasakul, 2013

= Aceratherium =

Aceratherium Temporal range: Miocene

Extinct genus of rhinoceros

Aceratherium, from Ancient Greek ἀ- (á-), meaning "-less", κέρας (kéras), meaning "horn", and θηρίον (theríon), meaning "beast", is an extinct genus of rhinocerotid of the subfamily Aceratheriinae that lived in Eurasia during the Miocene.

== Taxonomy ==
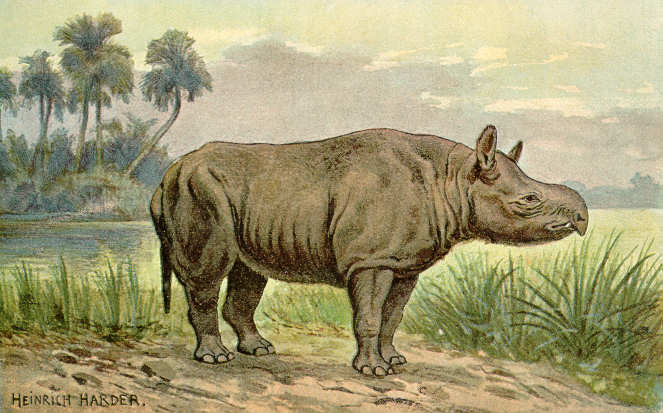
Restoration by Heinrich Harder

Aceratherium was coined by Kaup (1832) for "Rhinoceros" incisivum Cuvier, 1822 on the basis of the similarity of two skulls from Eppelsheim, Germany to the holotype incisor tooth from Weisenau in dental structure. However, the tooth from Weisenau has been recognized as belonging to a member of Teleoceratini, although the name Aceratherium has been widely used for the Eppelsheim skulls. Traditionally, many species have been referred to Aceratherium on the basis of them being hornless, turning the genus into a wastebasket. Revisions over the years have removed most species to the point that there are now only three valid species generally recognized (A. incisivum, A. depereti, and A. porpani).

== Description ==
Aceratherium reached 2.3 m (7 ft 7 in) in length, a height of about 120 cm (47 in) and a weight of nearly 1 ton. Its brachyodont dentition suggests it was a browser which fed on leaves and soft vegetables, though more recent analyses suggest that A. incisivum was actually a grazer. It had fairly long limbs compared to other Aceratheriinae, and was proportioned similar to a tapir. Males had tusk-like incisors that were much larger than those of the females.

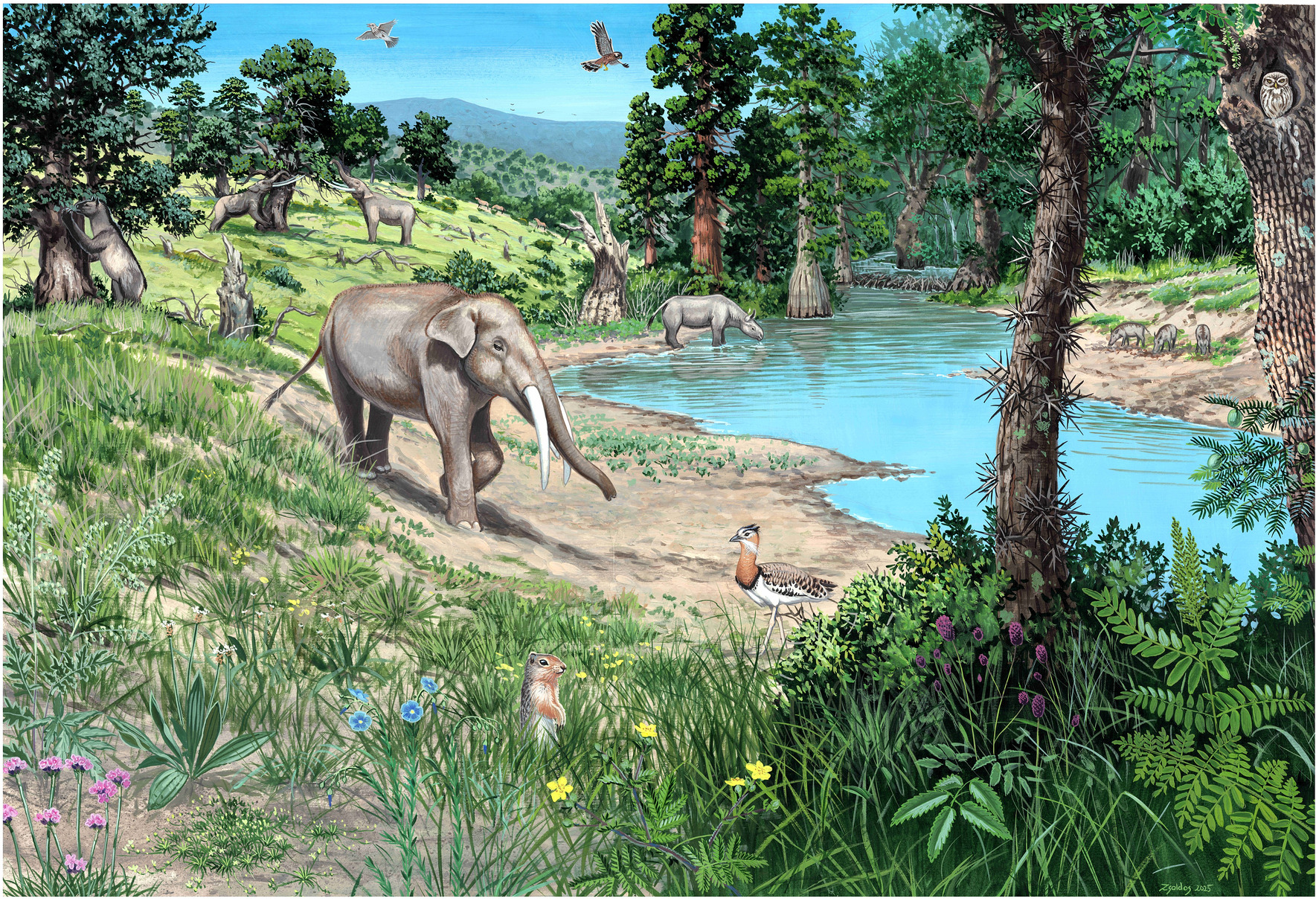
Late Miocene European landscape, including Aceratherium (background centre) as well as the chalicothere Chalicotherium, the proboscideans (elephant relatives) Gomphotherium angustidens and Zygolophodon turicensis, the swine Parachleuastochoerus, the equine Hipparion, the ground squirrel Spermophilinus, as well as kestrel bustard, little owl and lark
