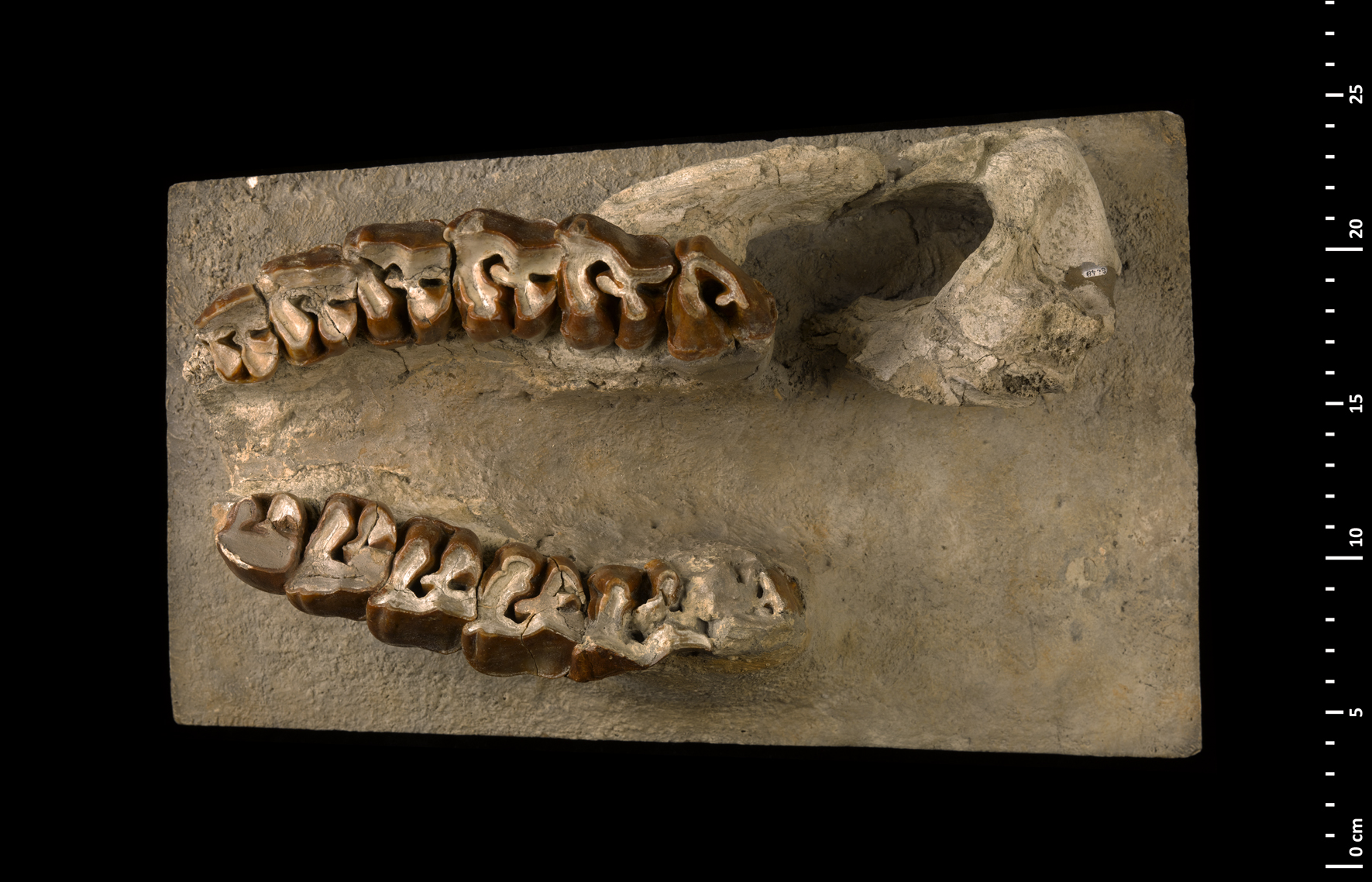
- Alicornops simorrense

Scientific classification
- Kingdom: Animalia
- Phylum: Chordata
- Class: Mammalia
- Order: Perissodactyla
- Family: Rhinocerotidae
- Subfamily: †Aceratheriinae
- Genus: †Alicornops; Ginsburg & Guerin, 1979

Type species
- †Alicornops simorrense Lartet, 1851

Species
- A. alfambrense; A. complanatum; A. laogouense; A. simorrense

= Alicornops =

Alicornops Temporal range: Miocene–Early Pliocene

Extinct genus of rhinoceros

Alicornops is an extinct genus of rhinocerotid belonging to the subfamily Aceratheriinae. It lived in Eurasia during the Miocene and Pliocene.

Four species are known. Two of them, Alicornops complanatum and Alicornops laogouense were described recently from the Siwaliks of Pakistan.

The type species, Alicornops simorrense, was a relatively small aceratheriine with a small horn, short tridactyl legs and strongly curved lower incisors.

== Palaeobiology ==
=== Palaeoecology ===
Paired δ^{13}C and δ^{18}O analysis of Alicornops fossils from the Linxia Basin of Gansu, China suggests that the genus mainly stuck to forest environments but that it had a generalist diet.
