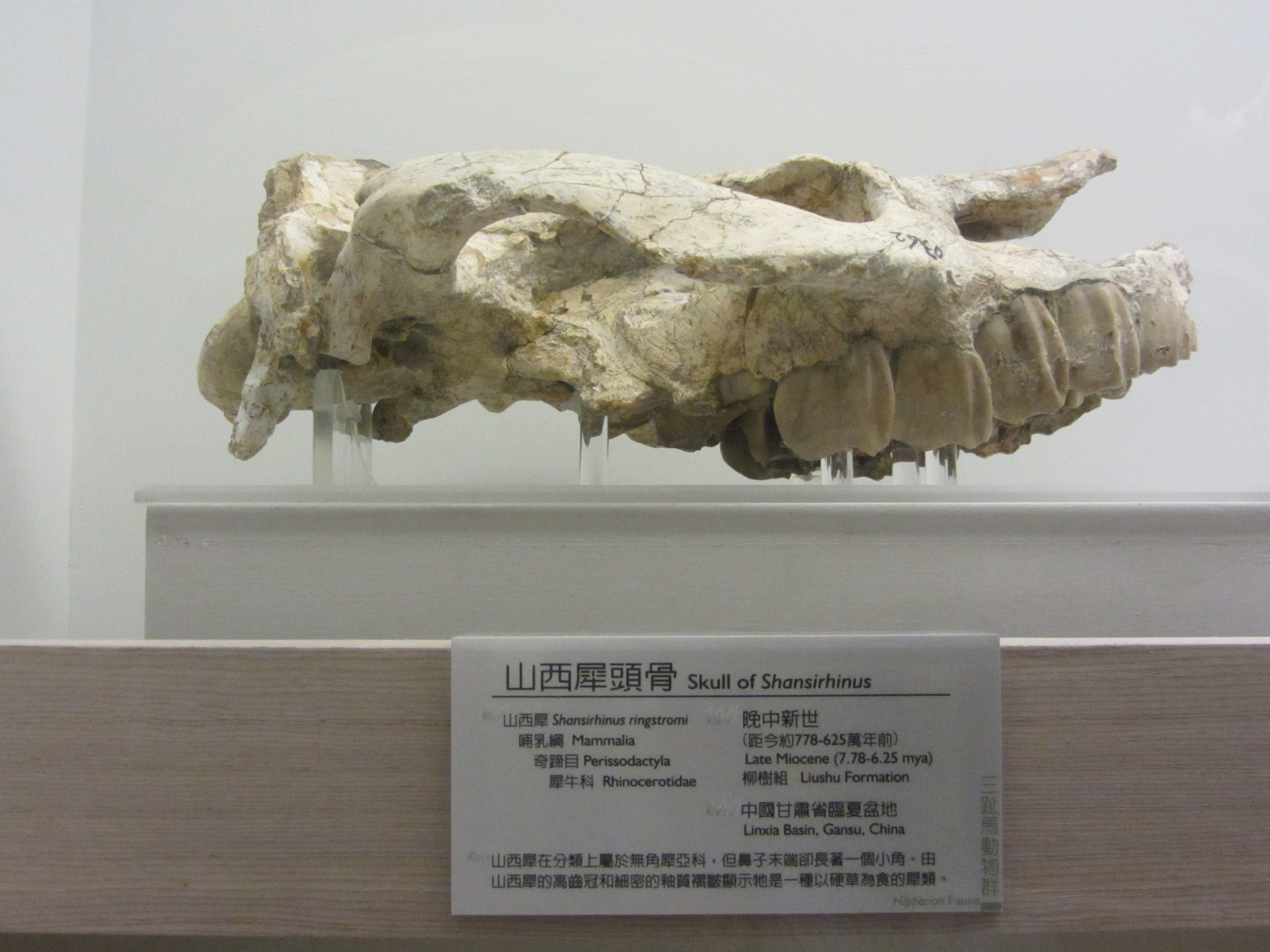
- Skull of Shansirhinus ringstromi

Scientific classification
- Kingdom: Animalia
- Phylum: Chordata
- Class: Mammalia
- Order: Perissodactyla
- Family: Rhinocerotidae
- Subfamily: †Aceratheriinae
- Genus: †Shansirhinus; Kretzoi, 1942

Type species
- †Shansirhinus ringstromi Kretzoi, 1942

Species
- S. brancoi; S. dengi; S. ringstromi

= Shansirhinus =

Shansirhinus Temporal range: Late Miocene–Pliocene

Extinct genus of rhinoceros

Shansirhinus is an extinct genus of rhinocerotid endemic to China during the Miocene through Pliocene.

Members of Shansirhinus were originally classified as species of Chilotherium.
