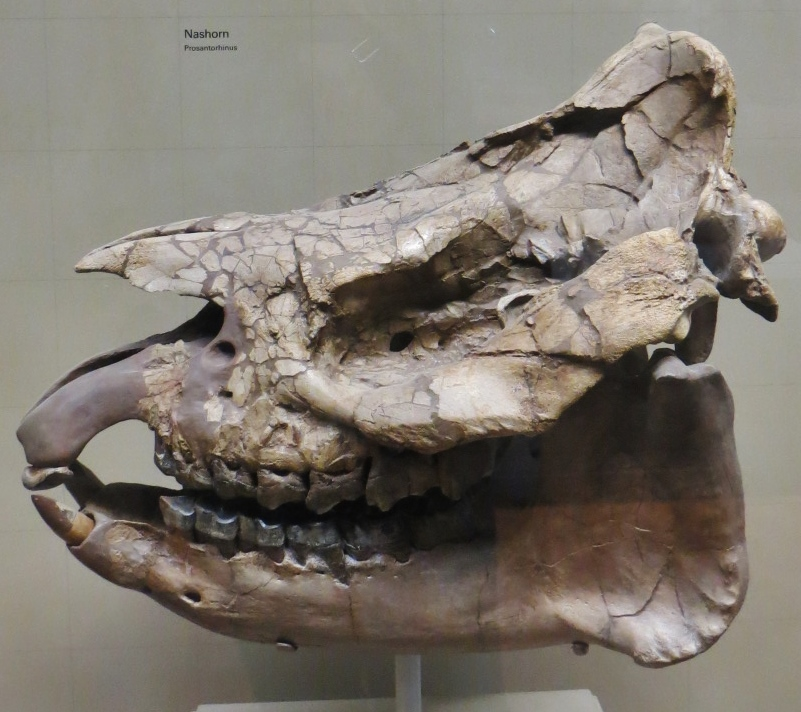

Scientific classification
- Kingdom: Animalia
- Phylum: Chordata
- Class: Mammalia
- Order: Perissodactyla
- Family: Rhinocerotidae
- Subfamily: †Aceratheriinae
- Genus: †Prosantorhinus; Heissig, 1973

Species
- Prosantorhinus douvillei Prosantorhinus germanicus Prosantorhinus shahbazi Prosantorhinus yei

= Prosantorhinus =

Prosantorhinus Temporal range: Miocene

Extinct genus of mammal

Prosantorhinus is an extinct genus of rhinocerotid that lived during the Early and Middle Miocene subepochs. The small rhinocerotid was found in Western Europe and Asia.

== Description ==
Prosantorhinus was a similarly sized animal to the Sumatran rhinoceros, it stood at around 4 ft 3 in (130 cm) at the shoulder and was about 9 ft 6 in (290 cm) long, weight estimates however are considerably bigger due to its considerably deeper chest. The body plan of Prosantorhinus is stubbier than that of other rhinocerotids, and its brachyodont molars would seem to suggest Prosantorhinus led a semiaquatic life, similar to a hippopotamus, possibly feeding on fresh water plants. The tooth eruption sequence of P. germanicus was identical to that of the present-day black rhinoceros, suggesting that it was a slow-growing and long-lived mammal. The rugged texture at the tip of its snout could suggest the existence of one, maybe two, small horns; however it has been traditionally reconstructed with a fleshy bump.

== Palaeobiology ==
=== Palaeoecology ===
Study of the dental mesowear and microwear of P. douvillei reveals that it was a folivorous browser.

=== Palaeopathology ===
Numerous teeth of P. douvillei from Béon 1 display signs of hypoplasia and aplasia. One juvenile P. germanicus specimen is known to show signs of major prenatal stress in the form of enamel hypoplasia found in a deciduous postcanine tooth. Another shows signs of hypercementosis, an abnormal deposition of cementum, and mandibular bone resorption, which was likely caused by periodontitis that developed as a result of dental calculus buildup and gingivitis.
