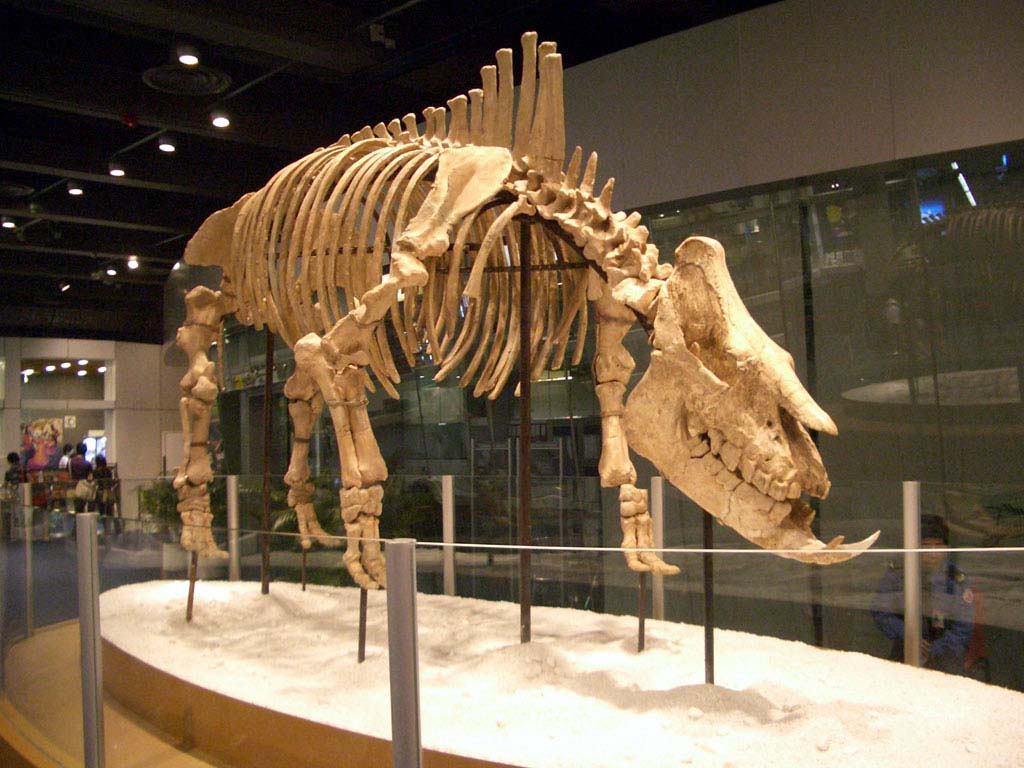

Scientific classification
- Kingdom: Animalia
- Phylum: Chordata
- Class: Mammalia
- Infraclass: Placentalia
- Order: Perissodactyla
- Family: Rhinocerotidae
- Subfamily: †Aceratheriinae
- Genus: †Chilotherium; Ringström 1924

Type species
- †Chilotherium anderssoni Ringström, 1924

Species
- See text

= Chilotherium =

Chilotherium Temporal range: Late Miocene–Pliocene

Extinct genus of hornless rhinoceros

Chilotherium, from Ancient Greek χείλος (cheílos), meaning "lip", and θηρίον (theríon), meaning "beast", is an extinct genus of rhinocerotids that lived in Africa and Eurasia during the Miocene through Pliocene living for 13.7—3.4 mya, existing for approximately 10.3 million years.

== Taxonomy ==
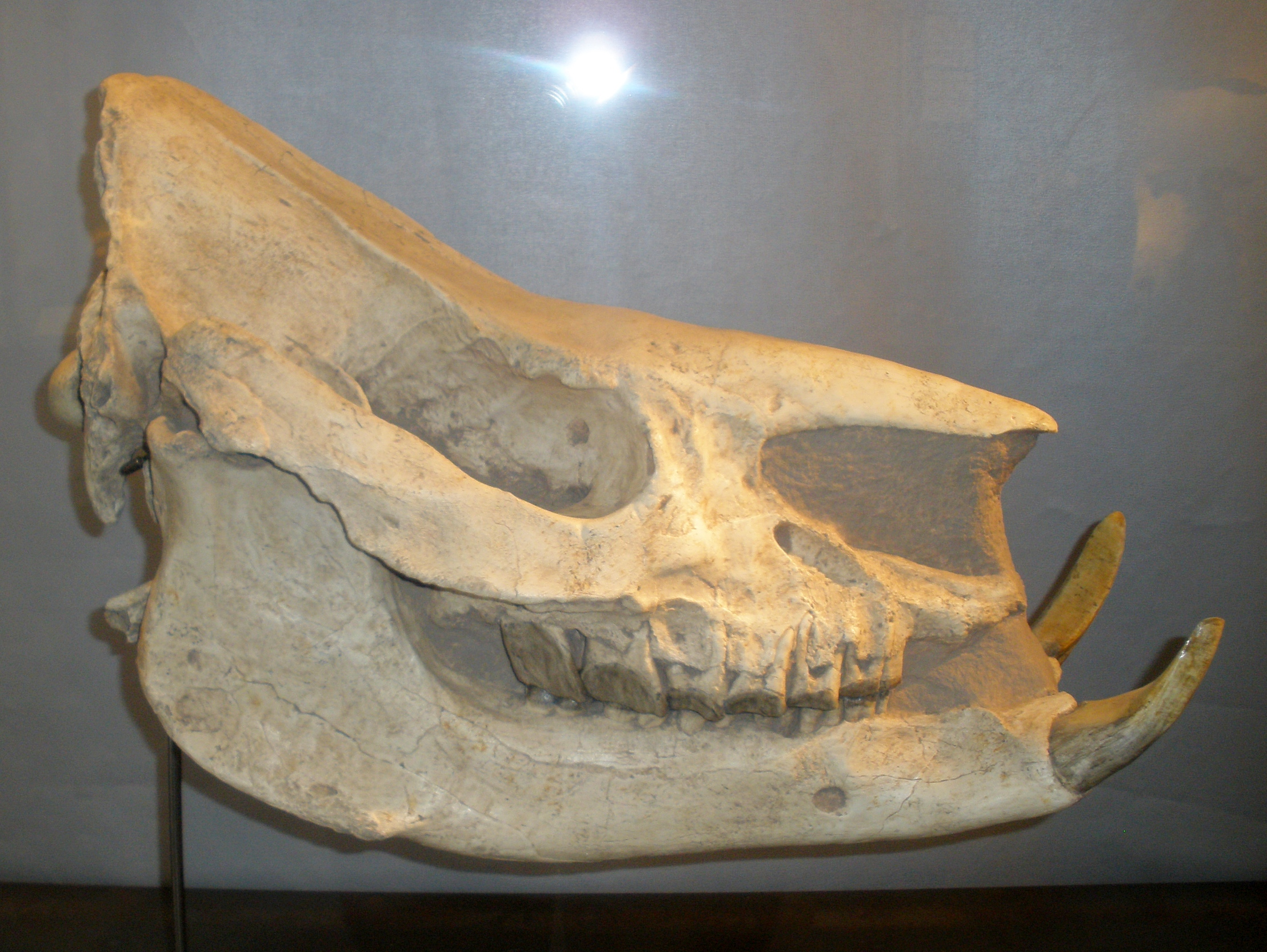
Profile of skull

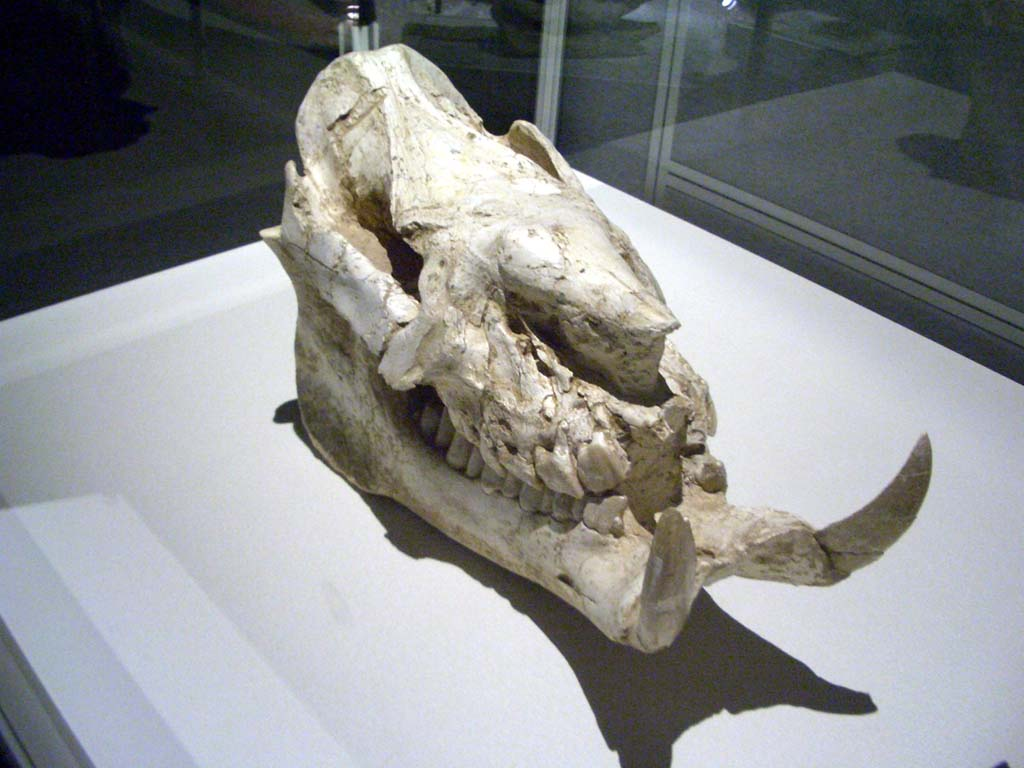
Chilotherium skull

Chilotherium was named by Ringström in 1924. It was assigned to Rhinocerotidae by Carroll (1988); to Aceratheriini by Antoine and Saraç (2005); and to Chilotheriini by Deng (2005).

=== Species ===
Twelve species of Chilotherium have been described and 19 other species have been assigned the genus. Nine are considered valid: four from Europe, one from Iran, and four from China.

Aprotodon differs from Chilotherium in its proportionally larger and wider symphysis; the horizontal mandibular ramus is curved both in side view and in dorsal view, unlike most rhinocerotids; and the premolars are semi-molariform, unlike the fully molariform premolars in Chilotherium. In Subchilotherium the mandibular symphysis is much more narrow than in Chilotherium. Acerorhinus has a strongly constricted nasal base and a mandibular symphysis that is narrow compared to that in Chilotherium.

Revised classification after Deng 2006, p. 102:
| Named species | Revised species | Location |
|---|---|---|
| C. blanfordi (Lydekker, 1884) | Aprotodon blanfordi (Lydekker, 1884) | Siwalik |
| C. fatehjangense (Pilgrim, 1910) | Aprotodon fatehjangense (Pilgrim, 1910) | Siwalik |
| C. smith-woodwardi (Foster-Cooper, 1915) | Aprotodon smith-woodwardi Foster-Cooper, 1915 | Siwalik |
| C. ibericum Antunes, 1972 | Hispanotherium matritense (Prado, 1863) | Portugal |
| C. quintanelensis Zbyszewski, 1952 | Hispanotherium matritense (Prado, 1863) | Portugal |
| C. zernowi (Borissiak, 1915) | Acerorhinus zernowi (Borissiak, 1915) | Odessa |
| C. palaeosinense (Ringström, 1924) | Acerorhinus palaeosinensis (Ringström, 1924) | China |
| C. hipparionum (Koken, 1885) | Acerorhinus hipparionum (Koken, 1885) | China |
| C. tsaidamense (Bohlin, 1937) | Acerorhinus tsaidamensis (Bohlin, 1937) | China |
| C. intermedium (Lydekker, 1884) | Subchilotherium intermedium (Lydekker, 1884) | Siwalik |
| C. tanggulaense Zheng, 1980 | Subchilotherium intermedium (Lydekker, 1884) | Siwalik |
| C. pygmaeum (Ringström, 1927) | Subchilotherium pygmaeum (Ringström, 1927) | China |
| C. brancoi (Schlosser, 1903) | Shansirhinus brancoi (Schlosser, 1903) | China |
| C. yunnanensis Tang et al., 1974 | Shansirhinus brancoi (Schlosser, 1903) | China |
| C. tianzhuensis Zheng, 1982 | Shansirhinus ringstromi Kretzoi, 1942 | China |
| C. cornutum Qiu & Yan, 1982 | Shansirhinus ringstromi Kretzoi, 1942 | China |
| C. samium (Weber, 1905) | C. samium (Weber, 1905) | Samos |
| C. schlosseri (Weber, 1905) | C. schlosseri (Weber, 1905) | Samos |
| C. ponticum (Niezabitowski, 1912) | C. schlosseri (Weber, 1905) | Samos |
| C. wegneri (Andree, 1921) | C. schlosseri (Weber, 1905) | Samos |
| C. kowalevskii (Pavlow, 1913) | C. kowalevskii (Pavlow, 1913) | Odessa |
| C. angustifrons (Andree, 1921) | C. kowalevskii (Pavlow, 1913) | Samos |
| C. kiliasi (Geraads & Koufos, 1990) | C. kiliasi (Geraads & Koufos, 1990) | Pentalophos |
| C. anderssoni Ringström, 1924 | C. anderssoni Ringström, 1924 | China |
| C. planifrons Ringström, 1924 | C. anderssoni Ringström, 1924 | China |
| C. fenhoensis Tung et al., 1975 | C. anderssoni Ringström, 1924 | China |
| C. habereri (Schlosser, 1903) | C. habereri (Schlosser, 1903) | China |
| C. gracile Ringström, 1924 | C. habereri (Schlosser, 1903) | China |
| C. wimani Ringström, 1924 | C. wimani Ringström, 1924 | China |
| C. xizangensis Ji et al., 1980 | C. xizangensis Ji et al., 1980 | China |
| C. persiae (Pohlig, 1885) | C. persiae (Pohlig, 1885) | Maragha |
| C. licenti Sun, Li & Deng, 2018 | C. licenti Sun, Li & Deng, 2018 | China |

== Description ==
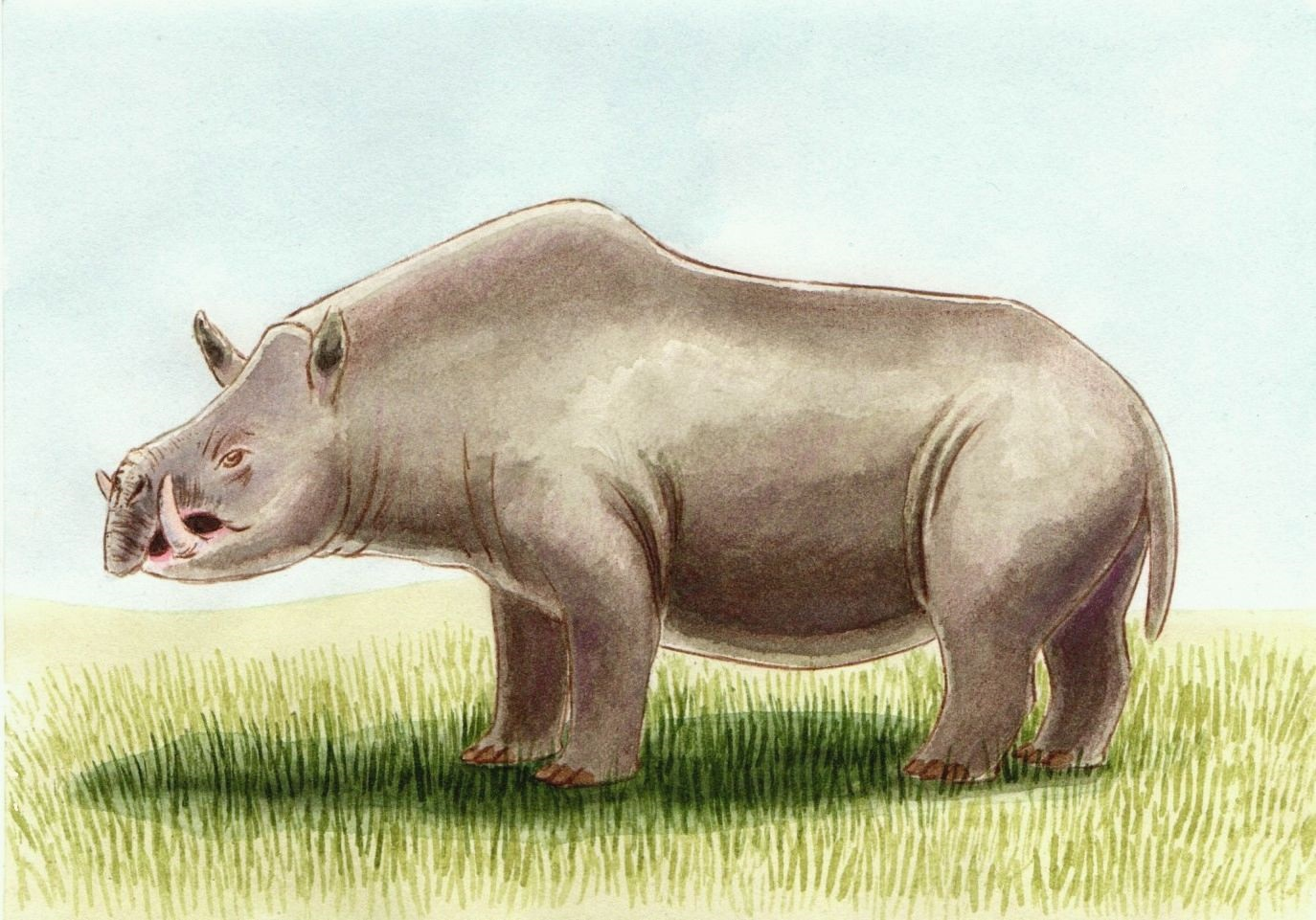
Life restoration showing a proboscis that has been proposed

It was a large, robust animal reaching 1.5–1.8 m (4 ft 11 in – 5 ft 11 in) in height and a weight between 1 and 2.5 t (1.1 and 2.8 short tons; 2,200 and 5,500 lb), depending on the species. Both sexes are hornless. The lower jaw has a widened symphysial part and large tusk-like second incisors separated by a broad diastema. The dental formula is 0.0.3.31(2).0.3.3. The limbs are very short and the body stout; the feet are tridactyl with diverging metapodials. At least in C. wimani, there is a significant sexual dimorphism in the tusks and mandible, most notably the length of the tusks in males.

Some features in Chilotherium, such as second incisors, mandible, cheek-teeth and other cranial features, may be plesiomorphic, while some features in the tusks are apomorphic: the dorsal surface of the tusks in primitive species is turned latero-dorsally in more derived species while the medial edge has become very sharp and sickle-like and rotated dorsally, and thus a more effective cutting tool.

== Paleobiology and paleoecology ==
=== Social behavior ===
Much like modern rhinoceros, C. wimani had a polygynous mating system. The tusk of males were usually broken or more worn down the tusks of females, which suggests increased agnostic interactions among males during sexual combat. Young males likely had a higher mortality than females due to competition with adults and predators. The abundance of C. wimani in Linxia Basin would suggest this species were likely traveled in herds.

=== Diet ===
Chilotherium were a group of grazing animals that radiated into several subgenera and species. Their feet were tridactyl and their legs shorter than in related groups. A few of them remained browsers, such as C. persiae, but most of them were adapted to a grass-based diet, hence the short legs. Their heads were horn-less but equipped with tusk-like lower incisors and were held in a horizontal position, in contrast to modern rhinos. They inhabited the so-called sub-Paratethyan or Greek-Iranian province during the late Miocene when this region was invaded by advanced rhinos from Africa, such as Ceratotherium (modern white rhinos). Like them, Chilotherium gradually evolved into specialised grazers, including hypsodont teeth and shortened metapodials. Dental microwear recovered C. schlosseri as a grazer.

On the other hand, isotopic analysis found C. intermedium was a browser and likely lived in forested environments, alongside Deinotherium. Both herbivores niche partitioned as Chilotherium preferred habitats very close to bodies of water compared to Deinotherium.

=== Palaeopathology ===
A female Chilotherium skull bears the distinctive bite marks of Dinocrocuta gigantea on the forehead. Based on the regrowth of bone around the injury, the rhinoceros escaped the predator's attack and later recovered.
