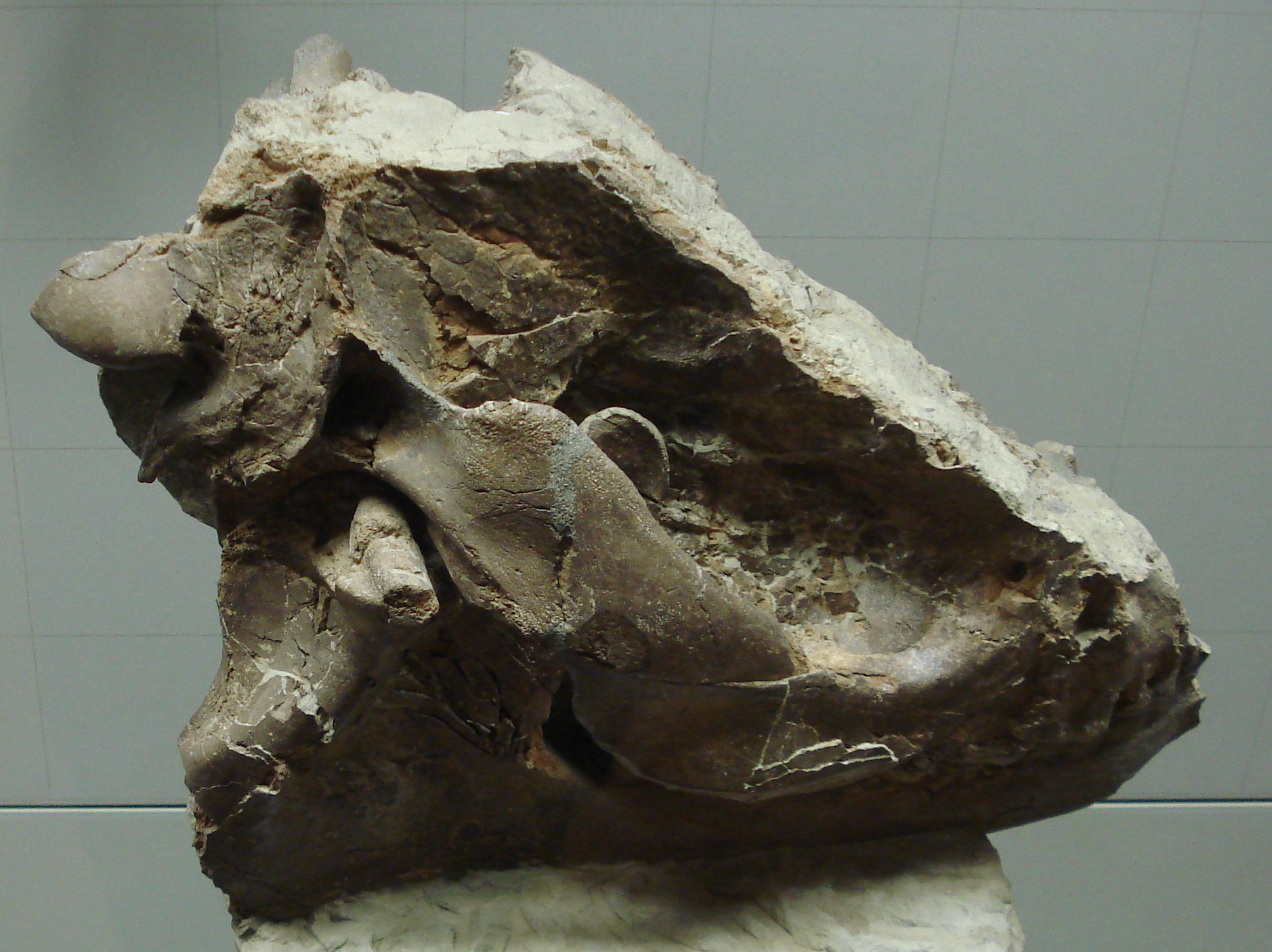
- Skull

Scientific classification
- Domain: Eukaryota
- Kingdom: Animalia
- Phylum: Chordata
- Class: Mammalia
- Order: Perissodactyla
- Family: Rhinocerotidae
- Subfamily: †Aceratheriinae
- Genus: †Mesaceratherium; Keissig, 1969

Species
- Mesaceratherium gaimersheimense Heissig, 1969; Mesaceratherium paulhiacense Richard, 1937

= Mesaceratherium =

Mesaceratherium Temporal range: Oligocene

Extinct genus of mammals

Mesaceratherium is an extinct genus of rhinocerotids.

== Palaeoecology ==
Dental microwear and mesowear paired with δ^{13}C analysis show that M. paulhiacense was a mixed feeder that fed predominantly on C_{3} plants.
