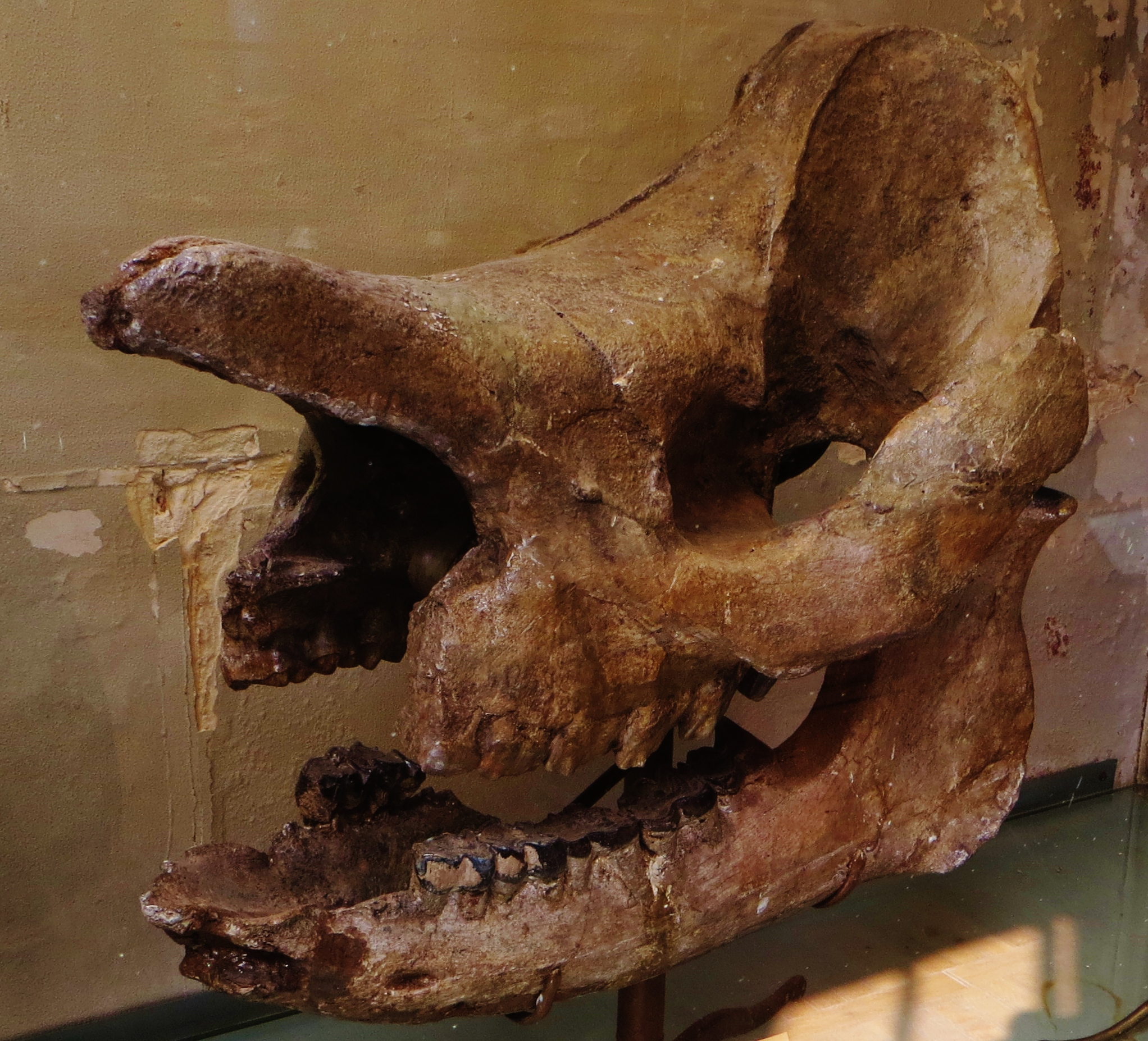
- D. aurelianense skull

Scientific classification
- Kingdom: Animalia
- Phylum: Chordata
- Class: Mammalia
- Infraclass: Placentalia
- Order: Perissodactyla
- Family: Rhinocerotidae
- Subfamily: †Aceratheriinae
- Genus: †Diaceratherium; Dietrich, 1931

Species
- See text.

= Diaceratherium =

Diaceratherium Temporal range: Oligocene–Early Miocene

Extinct genus of rhinoceros

Diaceratherium is an extinct genus of rhinocerotid from the Oligocene and Early Miocene of Eurasia.

== Species ==
Studies in 2019 suggested that seven species are valid:

- Diaceratherium aginense (Répelin, 1917)
- Diaceratherium askazansorense Kordikova, 2001
- Diaceratherium asphaltense (Depéret & Douxami, 1902)
- Diaceratherium aurelianense (Nouel, 1866)
- Diaceratherium lamilloquense Michel, 1987
- Diaceratherium lemanense (Pomel, 1853)
- Diaceratherium tomerdingense Dietrich, 1931, type species

Some sources separate the genus Brachydiceratherium from Diaceratherium, in which case some of the species listed above are placed in Brachydiceratherium.

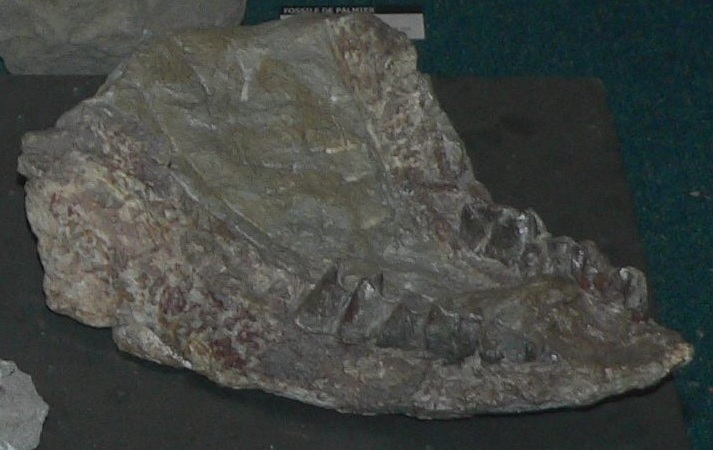
Diaceratherium aginense jaw

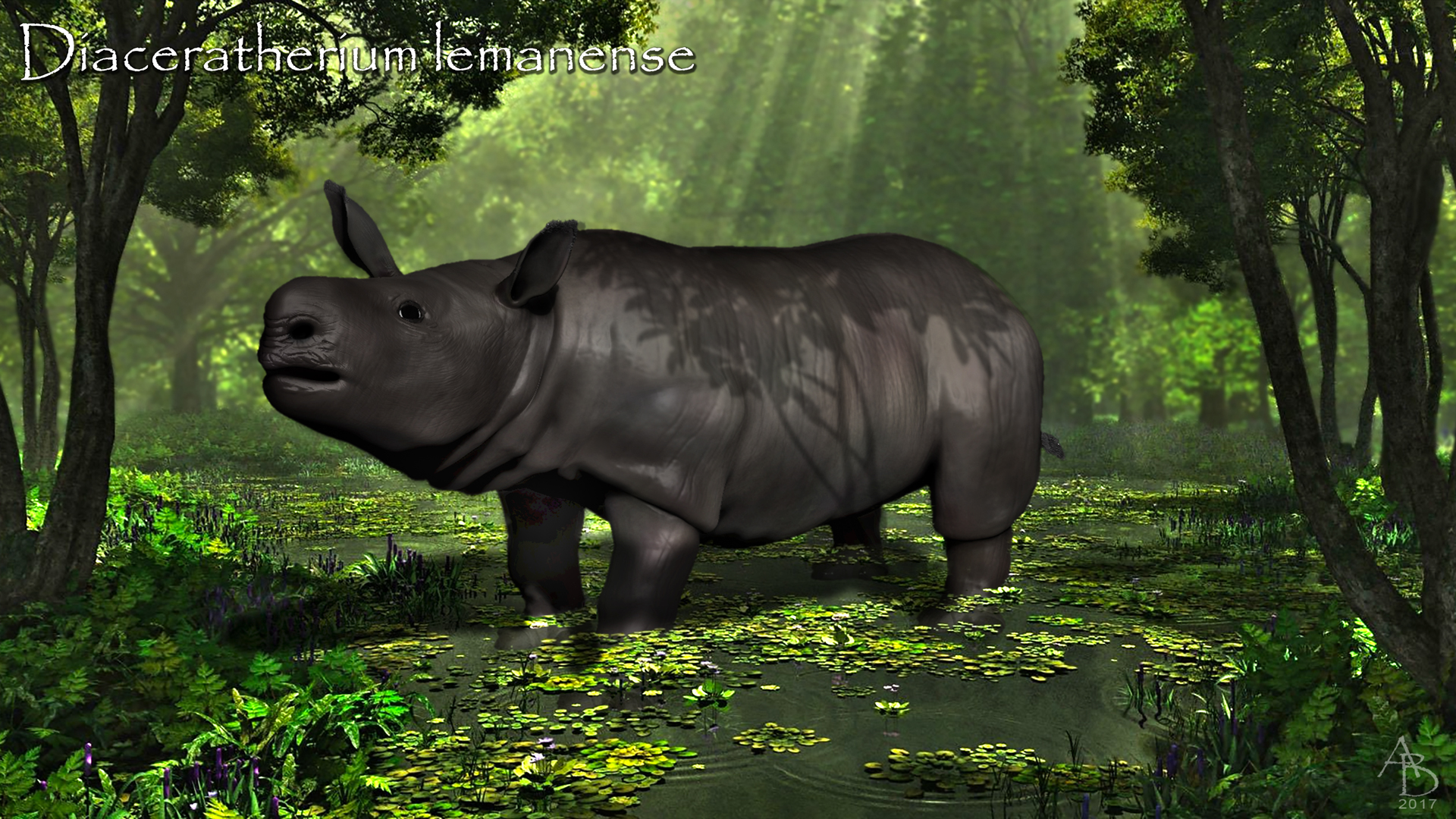
Restoration of Diaceratherium lemanense
