= Lamina affixa =

Layer of tissue lining the thalamus

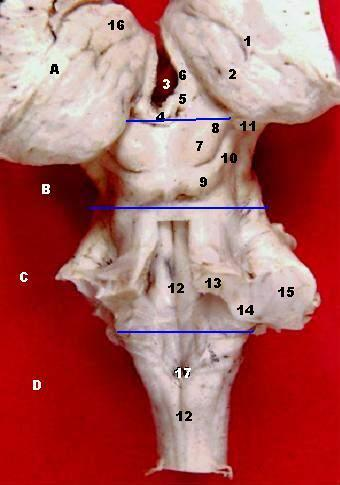
- 1. Taenia choroidea (and lateral: Lamina affixa, Stria terminalis); 2. Thalamus, Pulvinar thalami 3. Third ventricle 4. Stalk of pineal gland 5. Habenula; 6. Stria medullaris 7. Superior colliculus 8. Brachium of superior colliculus 9. Inferior colliculus 10. Brachium of inferior colliculus 11. Medial geniculate nucleus 12. Sulcus medianus 13. Superior cerebellar peduncles 14. Inferior cerebellar peduncle 15. Middle cerebellar peduncles 16. Anterior nucleus of thalamus 17. Obex, Area postrema

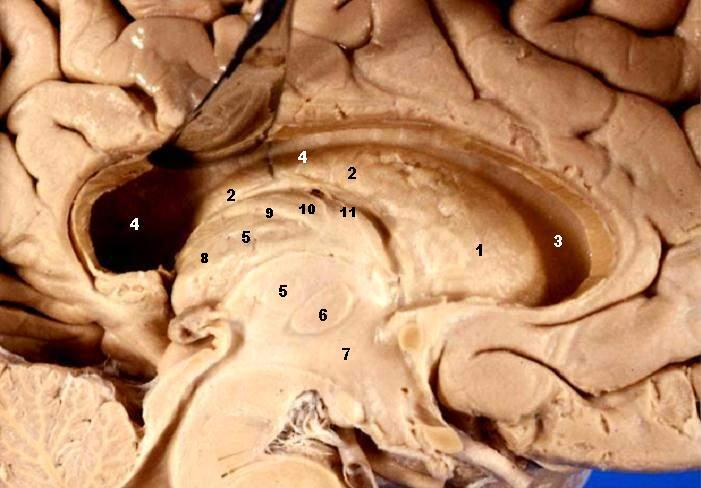
- Human brain left dissected midsagittal view (Lamina affixa is #10)

Details

Identifiers
- Latin: lamina affixa
- TA98: A14.1.09.276
- TA2: 5650
- FMA: 83709

Lamina affixa is a layer of epithelium growing on the surface of the thalamus and forming the floor of the central part of lateral ventricle, on whose medial margin is attached the choroid plexus of the lateral ventricle; it covers the superior thalamostriate vein and the superior choroid vein. The torn edge of this plexus is called the tela choroidea.

On the surface of the terminal vein is a narrow white band, named the lamina affixa.

GDF-15/MIC-1 has been observed in lamina affixa cells.
