= Great cerebral vein =

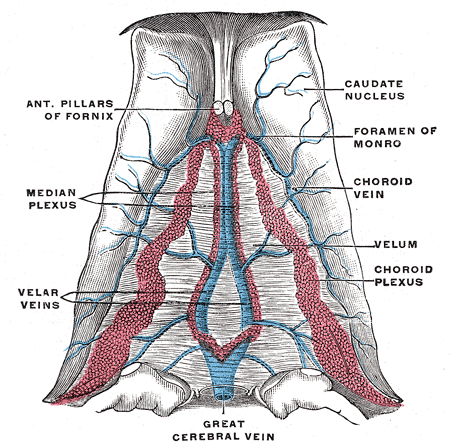
- Velum interpositum. (Great cerebral vein labeled at bottom center.)

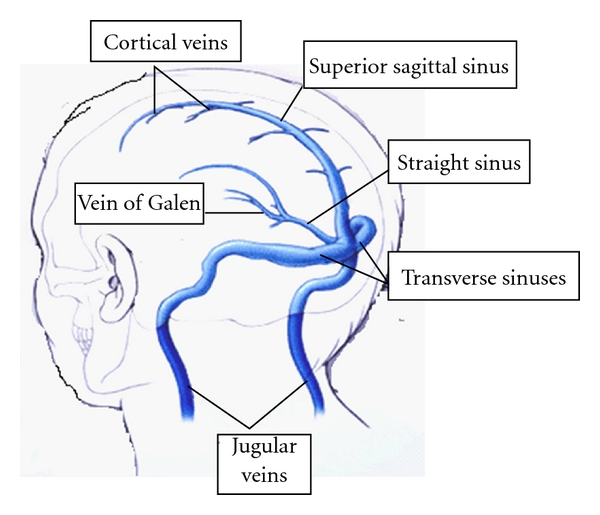
- Major dural venous sinuses with great cerebral vein shown as vein of Galen

Details
- Drains from: Cerebrum
- Source: Internal cerebral veins
- Drains to: Straight sinus
- Artery: Cerebral arteries

Identifiers
- Latin: vena magna cerebri
- TA98: A12.3.06.027
- TA2: 4922
- FMA: 50993

The great cerebral vein is one of the large blood vessels in the skull draining the cerebrum of the brain. It is also known as the vein of Galen, named for its discoverer, the Greek physician Galen.

== Structure ==
The great cerebral vein is one of the deep cerebral veins. Other deep cerebral veins are the internal cerebral veins, formed by the union of the superior thalamostriate vein and the superior choroid vein at the interventricular foramina. The internal cerebral veins can be seen on the superior surfaces of the caudate nuclei and thalami just under the corpus callosum. The veins at the anterior poles of the thalami merge posterior to the pineal gland to form the great cerebral vein. Most of the blood in the deep cerebral veins collects into the great cerebral vein. This comes from the inferior side of the posterior end of the corpus callosum and empties ie similarities, there are also differences between these two types of veins in the brain. The superficial veins at the dorsal parts of the hemispheres run upward and medially and empty into the large superior sagittal sinus in the upper margin of the falx cerebri. The superior sagittal sinus divides into two parts called the transverse sinuses where the falx cerebri meets the tentorium cerebelli. The sigmoid sinus, which continues the transverse sinus, empties into the jugular vein at the jugular foramen. The internal jugular vein leaves the skull and travels downward to the neck.

The length of the great cerebral vein of Galen varies from 0.15 to 4.2 cm (mean 0.93 cm).

The veins of the brain have very thin walls and contain no valves. They emerge in the brain and lie in the subarachnoid space. They pierce the arachnoid mater and the meningeal layer in the dura and drain into the cranial dural venous sinuses.

== Clinical significance ==
=== Malformations ===
Most conditions associated with the great cerebral vein are due to congenital defects. Vein of Galen aneurysmal malformations (VGAM) are the most common form of symptomatic cerebrovascular malformation in neonates and infants. The presence and locations of angiomas are very variable and do not follow any predictable pattern. The congenital malformation develops during weeks 6-11 of fetal development as a persistent embryonic prosencephalic vein of Markowski; thus, VGAM is actually a misnomer. The vein of Markowski actually drains into the vein of Galen. A falcine sinus lies within the falx cerebri and connects the vein of Galen and superior sagittal sinus; it is normally present during fetal development and involutes after birth, but its presence after birth is associated with a vein of Galen malformation and other vascular anomalies.

=== Absence ===
Absence of the great cerebral vein is a congenital disorder. The deep cerebral veins of the brain normally drain through the great cerebral vein. In its absence, the veins from the diencephalon and the basal ganglia drain laterally into the transverse sinus instead of conjoining in the midline through the Galenic drainage system. Absence of the great cerebral vein is quite rare. It is detected in infancy and most patients die in the neonatal period or in early infancy.

=== Thrombosis ===
Thrombosis of the great cerebral vein is a form of stroke due to a blood clot in the vein. It affects just 3 to 8% of patients, predominantly women. Patients may present with consciousness problems, headaches, nausea, visual defects, fatigue, disturbance of eye movements and pupillary reflexes, or coma. Thrombosis of the cerebral vein is often deadly but can be survived. Risk factors include oral contraceptives, pregnancy, and the postpartum period.

== History ==
The great cerebral vein bear the eponym of Galen, due to its mention being preserved in his 22 volumes of printed medical texts; these texts make up roughly half of preserved Greek medical texts.
