= Septal veins =

Cerebral vein

Details
- System: Circulatory system
- Drains from: Septum pellucidum
- Drains to: Internal cerebral veins

Identifiers
- Latin: vena anterior septi pellucidi
- Acronym: ASV

The septal veins, also called the anterior septal veins and the veins of the septum pellucidum, are veins of the cerebral venous system which drain blood from the septum pellucidum of the anterior frontal lobe. The septal veins unify with the superior thalamostriate vein and the superior choroidal vein at the interventricular foramina to form the internal cerebral veins.

== Structure ==
The septal veins drain blood from the septum pellucidum bilaterally and terminate at the venous angle formed with the thalamostriate veins. Research by Jonathan Roth et al., 2010, has shown that the septal veins are often asymmetrical. The positions of the septal veins vary in relation to the interventricular foramina and the internal cerebral veins.

== Clinical significance ==
Deep cerebral vein thrombosis is a rare condition characterized by the presence of a blood clot in the deep cerebral veins and can appear in the septal veins. This condition is commonly comorbid with other thrombi in the cerebral veins.
