= Lamina =

Lamina may refer to:

== People ==
- Saa Emerson Lamina, Sierra Leonean politician
- Tamba Lamina, Sierra Leonean politician and diplomat

== Science and technology ==
- Planar lamina, a two-dimensional planar closed surface with mass and density, in mathematics
- Laminar flow, (or streamline flow) occurs when a fluid flows in parallel layers, with no disruption between the layers
- Lamina (algae), a structure in seaweeds
- Lamina (anatomy), with several meanings
- Lamina (leaf), the flat part of a leaf, an organ of a plant
- Lamina, the largest petal of a floret in an aster family flowerhead: see Glossary of botanical terms § lamina
- Lamina (spider), a genus in the family Toxopidae
- Lamina (neuropil), the most peripheral neuropil of the insect visual system
- Nuclear lamina, another structure of a living cell
- Basal lamina, a structure of a living cell
- Lamina propria, the connective part of the mucous
- Lamina of the vertebral arch
- Lamination (geology), a layering structure in sedimentary rocks usually less than 1 cm in thickness
- Laminae, a part of the horse hoof
- Laminae, another name for the core lamiids, a clade in botany

== See also ==
- Lamia, a creature from Greek mythology.
- Lamia (Basque mythology), a creature from Basque mythology
- Lamina cribrosa (disambiguation)
- Laminar (disambiguation)
