= Fronto-polar thalamic vein =

Fronto-polar thalamic veins, also known as anterior thalamic veins

Details
- Drains from: anterior portion of the corresponding half of the thalamus
- Drains to: Internal cerebral vein

Identifiers
- Latin: venae fronto-polares thalami dextra et sinistra, or venae anteriores thalami dextra et sinistra

The paired (right and left) fronto-polar thalamic veins (Latin: venae fronto-polares thalami dextra et sinistra) originate each on the corresponding frontal polus of the thalamus and drain its anterior portion. Benno Shlesinger in 1976 classified these veins as belonging to the central group of thalamic veins (venae centrales thalami).
