= Deep cerebral vein =

Deep cerebral vein may refer to:

- Deep cerebral veins, a group of veins in the head
- Deep middle cerebral vein, a vein which receives tributaries from the insula and neighboring gyri in the brain
