= Medial anterior thalamic vein =

Medial anterior thalamic veins

Details
- Drains from: anterior portion of the corresponding half of the thalamus
- Drains to: internal cerebral vein

Identifiers
- Latin: venae mediales anterior thalami dextra et sinistra

The paired (right and left) medial anterior thalamic veins (Latin: venae mediales anterior thalami dextra et sinistra) originate each from the medial anterior part of the thalamus. Benno Shlesinger in 1976 classified these veins as belonging to the central group of thalamic veins (venae centrales thalami).
