= Hypothalamic sulcus =

Groove in the third ventricle

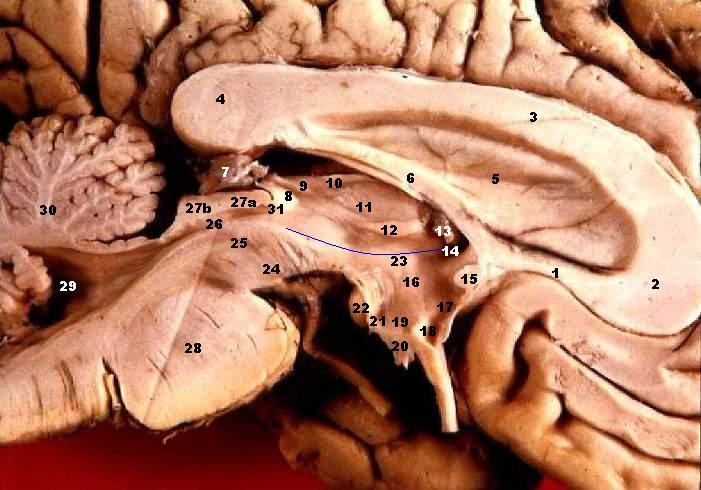
- Sagittal section of human brain. Hypothalamic sulcus is 23 (blue line)

Details

Identifiers
- Latin: sulcus hypothalamicus
- NeuroNames: 449
- TA98: A14.1.08.422
- TA2: 5779
- FMA: 78465

The hypothalamic sulcus (sulcus of Monro) is a groove in the lateral wall of the third ventricle, marking the boundary between the thalamus and hypothalamus. The upper and lower portions of the lateral wall of the third ventricle correspond to the alar lamina and basal lamina, respectively, of the lateral wall of the fore-brain vesicle and are separated from each other by a furrow, the hypothalamic sulcus, which extends from the interventricular foramen to the cerebral aqueduct.
