= Laterodorsal thalamic vein =

Laterodorsal thalamic veins (left and right)

Details
- Drains from: lateral dorsal part of the thalamus
- Drains to: superior thalamostriate vein

Identifiers
- Latin: venae latero-dorsales thalami dextra et sinistra

The paired (right and left) laterodorsal thalamic veins (Latin: venae latero-dorsales thalami dextra et sinistra) originate each from the lateral dorsal part of the corresponding half of the thalamus. Benno Shlesinger in 1976 classified these veins as belonging to the lateral group of thalamic veins (venae laterales thalami).
