= Superior thalamic vein =

Superior thalamic vein, formerly also known as principal thalamic vein or centromedial thalamic vein

Details
- Drains from: centro-medial portion of the thalamus
- Drains to: internal cerebral vein

Identifiers
- Latin: vena superioris thalami, or vena principalis thalami, or vena centro-medialis thalami

The superior thalamic vein (Latin: vena superioris thalami), initially called by Benno Schlesinger in 1976 the principal thalamic vein (vena principalis thalami) or centro-medial thalamic vein (vena centro-medialis thalami), also called by Russian surgeon Pirogoff internal thalamic vein (vena interioris thalami) is the most prominent vein of the thalamus. It shows great interindividual anatomic variations.
