= Colloid cyst =

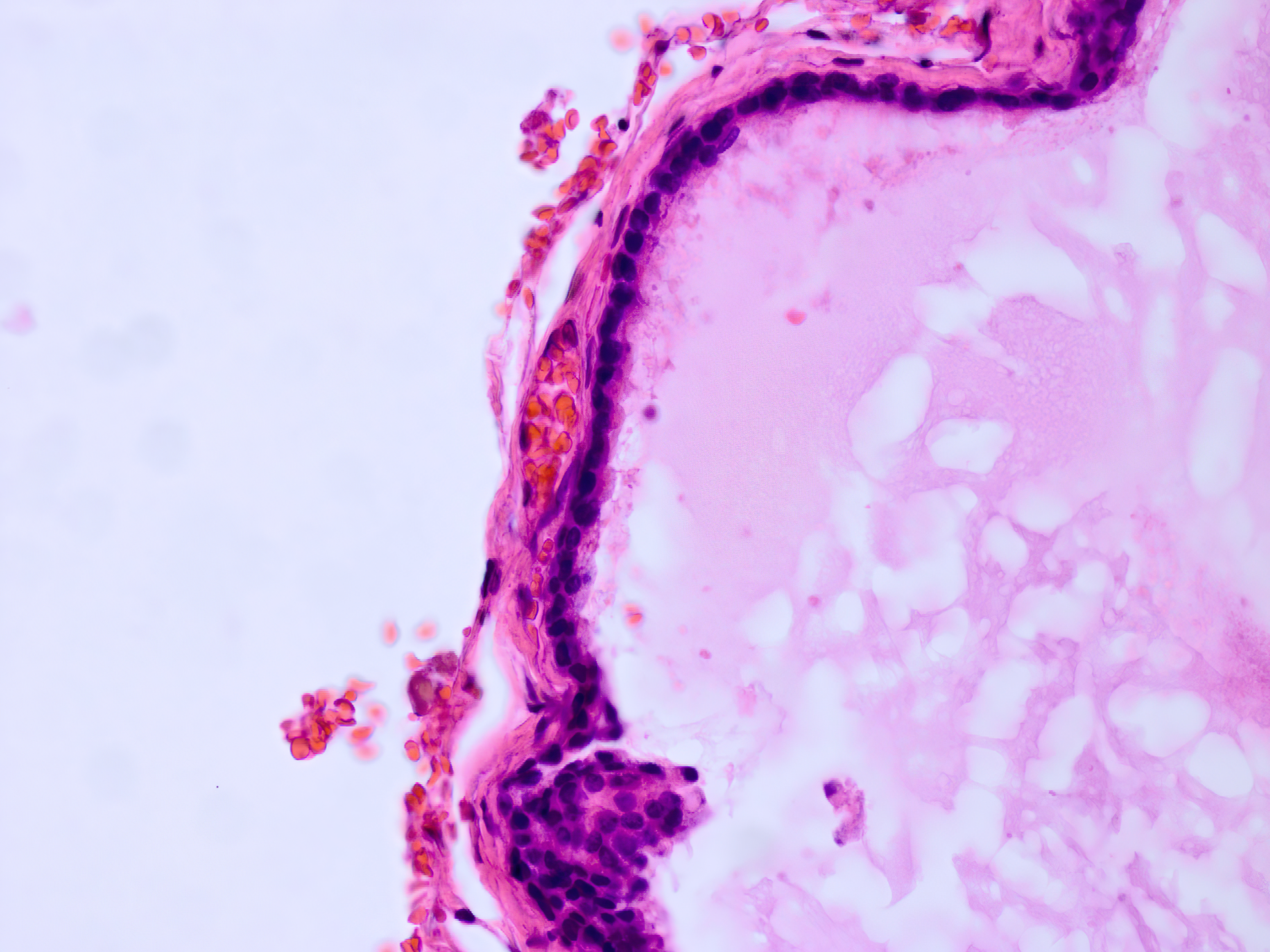
- Histopathology of colloid cyst

CT scan of a 1 cm colloid cyst

A colloid cyst is a non-malignant tumor in the brain. It consists of a gelatinous material contained within a membrane of epithelial tissue. It is almost always found just posterior to the foramen of Monro in the anterior aspect of the third ventricle, originating from the roof of the ventricle. Because of its location, it can cause obstructive hydrocephalus and increased intracranial pressure. Colloid cysts represent 0.5–1.0% of intracranial tumors.

Symptoms can include headache, vertigo, memory deficits, diplopia, behavioral disturbances, and in extreme cases, sudden death. Intermittency of symptoms is characteristic of this lesion. Untreated pressure caused by these cysts can result in brain herniation. Colloid cyst symptoms have been associated with four variables: cyst size, cyst imaging characteristics, ventricular size, and patient age. Their developmental origin is unclear, though they may be of endodermal origin, which would explain the mucin-producing, ciliated cell type. These cysts can be surgically resected, and opinion is divided about the advisability of this.

== Symptoms ==
Patients with third-ventricular colloid cysts become symptomatic when the tumor enlarges rapidly, causing cerebrospinal fluid (CSF) obstruction, ventriculomegaly, and increased intracranial pressure. Some cysts enlarge more gradually, however, allowing the patient to accommodate the enlarging mass without disruption of CSF flow, and the patient remains asymptomatic. In these cases, if the cyst stops growing, the patient can maintain a steady state between CSF production and absorption and may not require neurosurgical intervention.

== Diagnosis ==
This is an image of a regular brain and a brain with a colloid cyst.

Colloid cysts can be diagnosed by symptoms presented. Additional testing is required and the colloid cyst symptoms can resemble those of other diseases. MRI and CT scans are often used to confirm diagnosis.

== Treatment ==
There are various management options depending on the severity of symptoms and their effects on the patient. The main management options are observation, craniotomy for microsurgical resection, neuroendoscopic removal, stereotactic drainage, and CSF diversion with bilateral ventriculoperitoneal shunting placement.

=== Surgical resection ===
Multiple studies have discussed how to remove a colloid cyst. One option is an endoscopic removal. An endoscope is inserted into the brain via a small incision and then moved toward the tumor in the ventricular compartment. The tumor is hit with an electric current. The interior of the cyst is removed followed by the cyst wall. The electric current is then used to kill the remaining pieces of the cyst. This whole process, including closing of the incision and removal of the scope, is completed within 45 minutes to an hour. The patients are able to leave the hospital after 1 or 2 days. Quality of life is found to be better following endoscopic excision than microsurgery, with cysts smaller than 18 mm showing better cognitive outcome. Another study found that ventriculomegaly may not be a contraindication for endoscopic removal, as the condition has comparable complication rates. Another study experimented with a smaller retractor tube, 12 mm instead of 16–22 mm. The surgery was successful in removing the cyst; the smaller retractor tube minimized resection injury.

Neuroendoscopic third ventriculostomy during surgery can be used to prevent further postoperative hydrocephalus. This removes the need for insertion of bilateral shunts.

Patients who have had a colloid cyst removed from the third ventricle sometimes experience some difficulty with day‐to‐day memory. Mammillary body atrophy in patients with surgical removal of colloid cysts indicates that this atrophy is partly due to a loss of temporal lobe projections in the fornix.
