= Medial pulvinary vein =

Medial pulvinary veins (right and left)

Details
- Drains from: medial portion of the pulvinar of the thalamus
- Drains to: internal cerebral vein

Identifiers
- Latin: venae pulvinares mediales dextra et sinistra

The paired (left and right) medial pulvinary veins (Latin: venae pulvinares mediales) are veins that drain blood from the corresponding halves of medial part of the pulvinar of the thalamus into the corresponding internal cerebral vein
