= Falcine sinus =

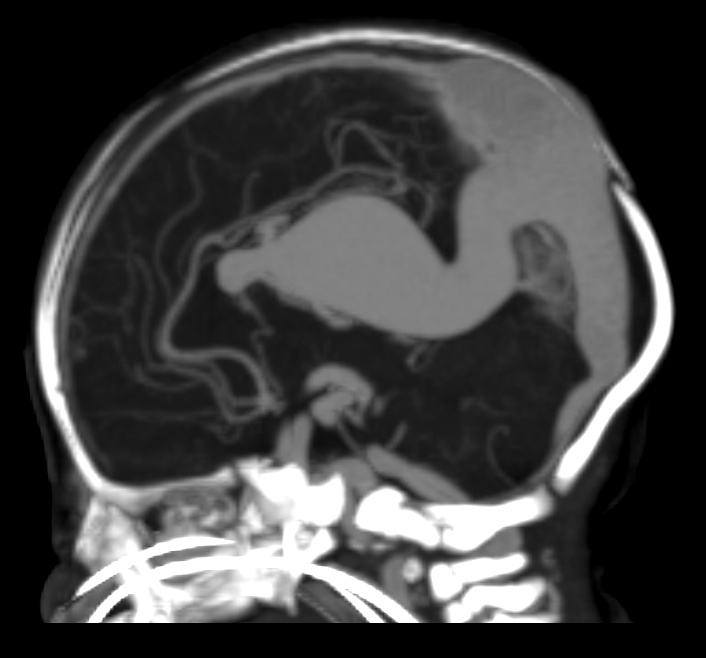
Maximum-intensity projection from a CT cerebral angiogram showing an aneurysmal deep venous structure which drains to the vein of Galen, and then to an abnormally dilated falcine sinus

A falcine sinus is a venous channel that lies within the falx cerebri connecting the vein of Galen and the posterior part of superior sagittal sinus. It is normally present during fetal development and involutes after birth. The presence of a falcine sinus has been associated with a vein of Galen malformation and other vascular anomalies. The persistence of a falcine sinus after the neonatal period was previously thought to be rare, but has recently been described to be present in up to 5% of all people, appearings in approximately 2.1% of CT examinations of adult patients. Some authors have studied the plexus rather than the sinus, a rare form of the venous pathway between the layers of the cerebral falx, which connects the superior sagittal sinus with the inferior sagittal sinus and the straight sinus.
