= Laminar =

Laminar means "flat". Laminar may refer to:

Terms in science and engineering:

- Laminar electronics or organic electronics, a branch of material sciences dealing with electrically conductive polymers and small molecules
- Laminar armour or "banded mail", armour made from horizontal overlapping rows or bands of solid armour plates
- Laminar flame speed, a property of a combustible mixture
- Laminar flow, a fluid flowing in parallel layers with no disruption between the layers
- Laminar organization, the way certain tissues are arranged in layers
- Laminar set family, a mathematical structure.
- A common leaf shape.

Proper nouns:

- Laminar Research, a Columbia, South Carolina, software company
- Icaro Laminar, an Italian hang glider design
- Pazmany Laminar, a personal light aircraft designed by Ladislao Pazmany

== See also ==
- Lamina (disambiguation)
