= Tela choroidea =

Part of the membranes around the brain

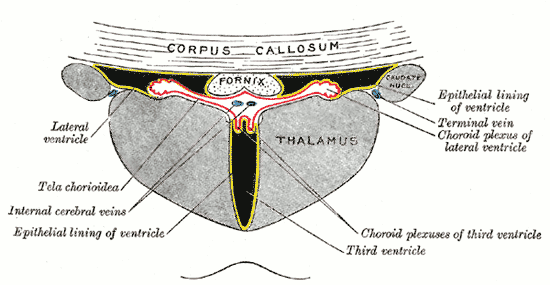
- Tela choroidea and choroid plexus

The tela choroidea (or tela chorioidea) is a region of meningeal pia mater that adheres to the underlying ependyma, and gives rise to the choroid plexus in each of the brain’s four ventricles. Tela is Latin for woven and is used to describe a web-like membrane or layer. The tela choroidea is a very thin part of the loose connective tissue of pia mater overlying and closely adhering to the ependyma. It has a rich blood supply. The ependyma and vascular pia mater – the tela choroidea, form regions of minute projections known as a choroid plexus that projects into each ventricle. The choroid plexus produces most of the cerebrospinal fluid of the central nervous system that circulates through the ventricles of the brain, the central canal of the spinal cord, and the subarachnoid space. The tela choroidea in the ventricles forms from different parts of the roof plate in the development of the embryo.

== Structure ==
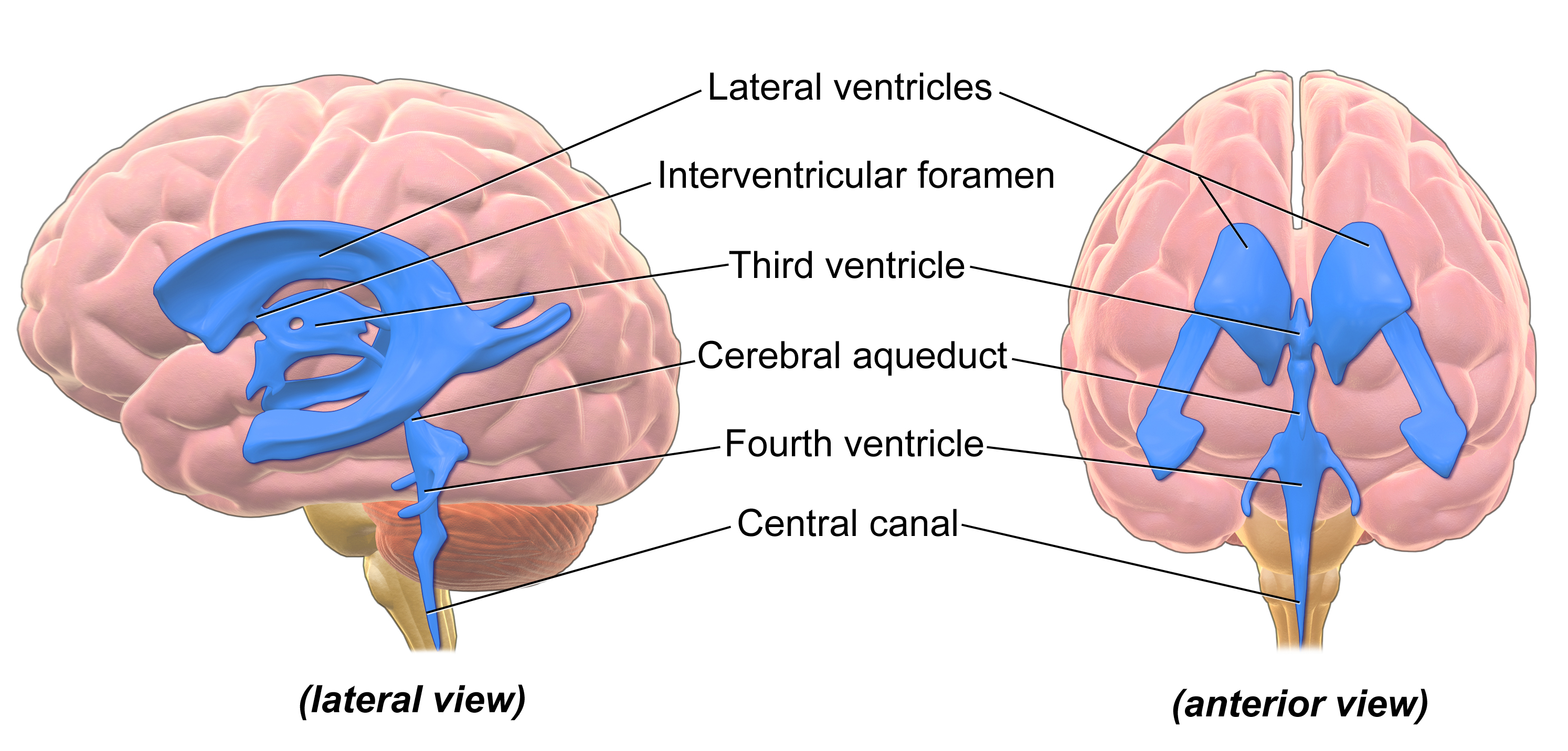
Ventricles of the brain

In the lateral ventricles, the tela choroidea–a double-layered fold of pia mater and ependyma, produces the choroid fissure (sometimes also called the choroidal fissure but this is different from the choroidal fissure of the optic stalk). The choroid fissure is C-shaped, runs between the fornix and the thalamus in the body of the ventricle, and between the stria terminalis and hippocampal fimbria in the inferior horn, and is the location of the attachment of the margins of the choroid plexus. In the choroid fissure of the lateral ventricles, the tela choroidea is a lateral extension of the tela choroidea from the third ventricle.

In the third ventricle, the tela choroidea forms the roof of the ventricle. Two vascular fringes from the lower fold invaginate the roof and form the choroid plexus.

The tela choroidea of the fourth ventricle (also known as the triangular lamella) is a double layer of pia mater and ependyma, between the cerebellum and the lower part of the roof of the fourth ventricle. The two layers are continuous with each other in front, and are mostly adherent throughout. The anterior layer of the fold, contains vascular fringes which make up the choroid plexus. The anterior layer is continuous inferiorly with the pia mater on the inferior cerebellar peduncles and the closed part of the medulla oblongata. The posterior layer covers the antero-inferior surface of the cerebellum.

Cilia on the ependymal cells move to circulate the cerebrospinal fluid. These cilia are unusually multiple primary cilia.

=== Blood supply ===
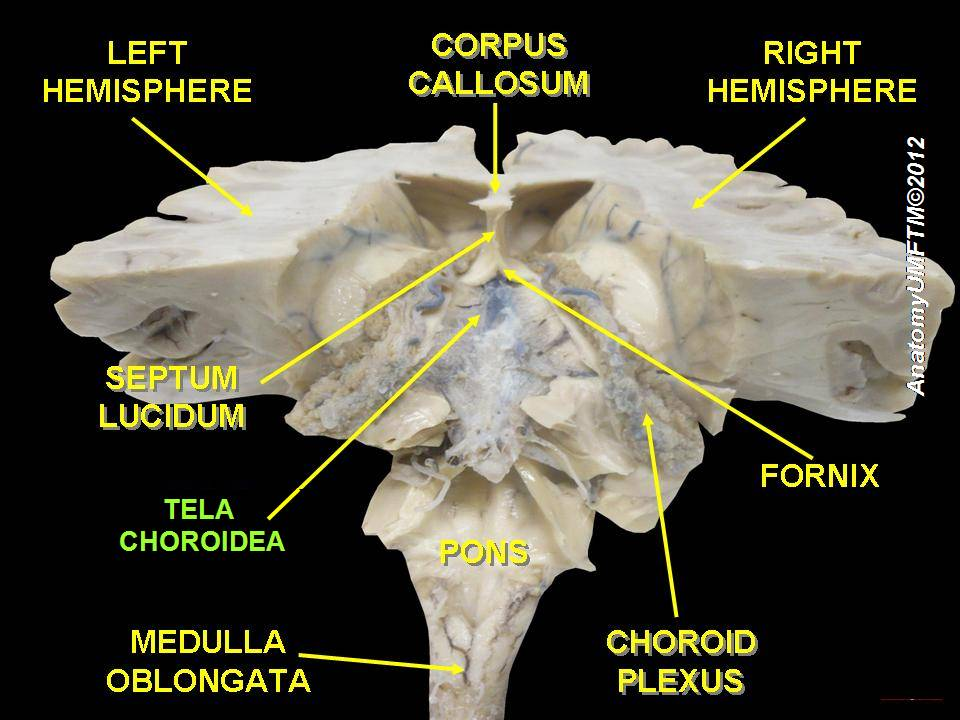
Tela choroidea

The blood supply of these plexuses is from the posterior inferior cerebellar artery. The lateral ventricles also contains the right and left internal cerebral veins (which drain the choroid plexuses) at its roof (the two veins unite to form the great cerebral vein).

The arteries carrying blood into the choroid plexuses are:

1. the anterior choroidal artery (branch from the internal carotid).
2. the posterior choroidal artery (branch from the posterior cerebral artery).

Medial posterior choroidal branches run forward beneath the splenium of the corpus callosum, and supply the tela chorioidea of the third ventricle and the choroid plexus.

== See also ==
- Choroidal fissure cyst
