= Suprapineal recess =

Anatomical structure in the ventricular system of the brain

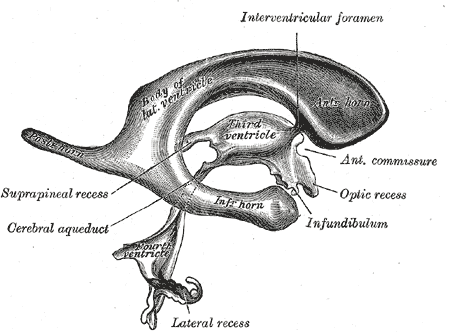
- Drawing of a cast of the ventricular cavities, viewed from the side.

Details

Identifiers
- Latin: recessus suprapinealis
- NeuroNames: 455
- TA98: A14.1.08.413
- TA2: 5770
- FMA: 78457

The suprapineal recess is an anatomical structure in the ventricular system of the brain. It is located in the posterior part of the third ventricle, overlying the cerebral aqueduct.

In severe cases of hydrocephalus with increased pressure, this structure can dilate causing mass effect on the midbrain resulting in Parinaud's syndrome with bilateral inward and downward deviation of the eyes.

== Additional images ==
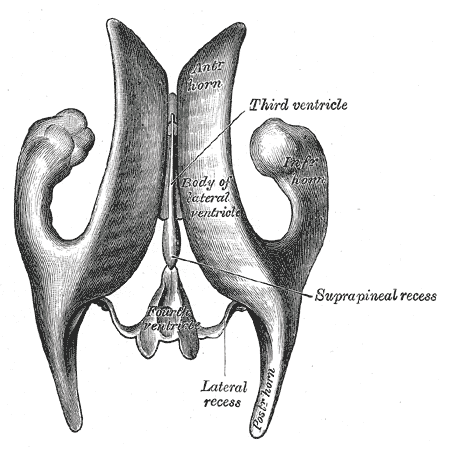
Drawing of a cast of the ventricular cavities, viewed from above.
