= Choroidal fissure cyst =

Type of cyst

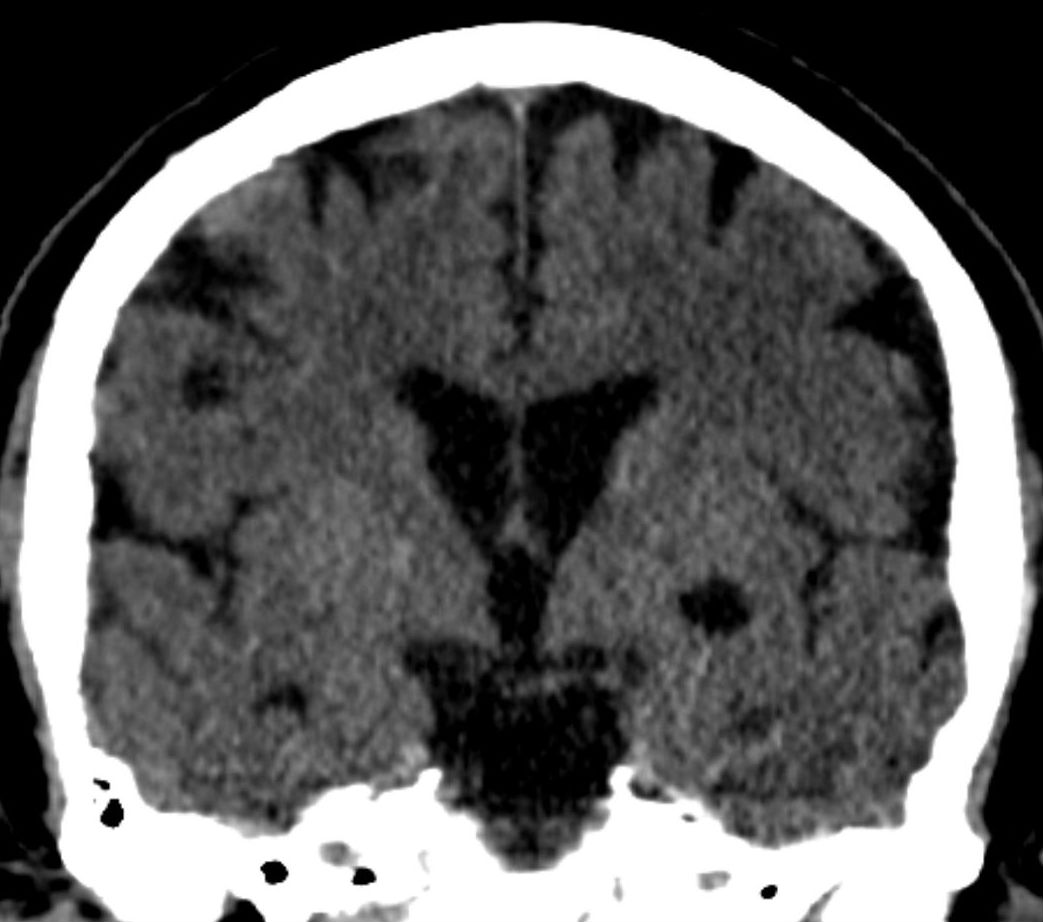
Coronal CT of the brain showing a choroidal fissure cyst

A choroidal fissure cyst is a cyst at the level of the choroidal fissure of the brain. They are usually asymptomatic and do not require treatment.
