= Optic recess =

Anatomical depression of the third ventricle

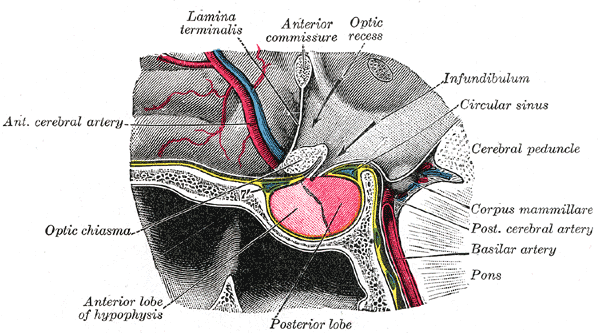
- The hypophysis cerebri, in position. Shown in sagittal section. (Optic recess labeled at upper right.)

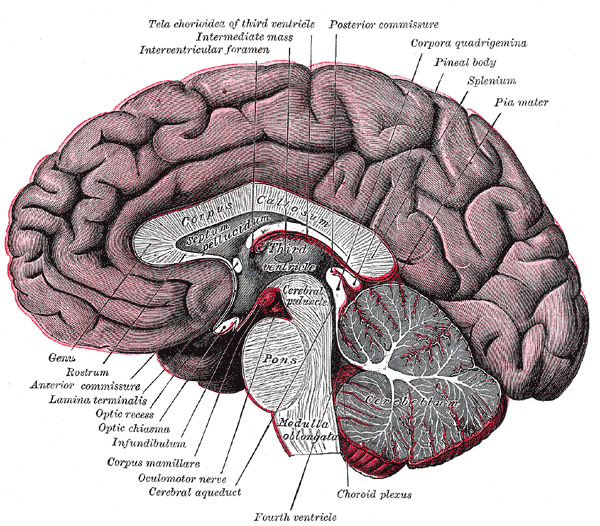
- Median sagittal section of brain. The relations of the pia mater are indicated by the red color. (Optic recess labeled at lower left.)

Details

Identifiers
- Latin: recessus supraopticus
- NeuroNames: 457
- NeuroLex ID: nlx_144280
- TA98: A14.1.08.418
- TA2: 5773
- FMA: 78455

At the junction of the floor and anterior wall of the third ventricle, immediately above the optic chiasma, the ventricle presents a small angular recess or diverticulum, the optic recess (or supraoptic recess).

== Additional images ==
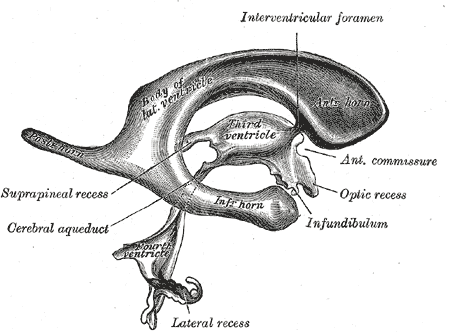
Drawing of a cast of the ventricular cavities, viewed from the side.
