= Stria terminalis =

Band of fibres along the thalamus

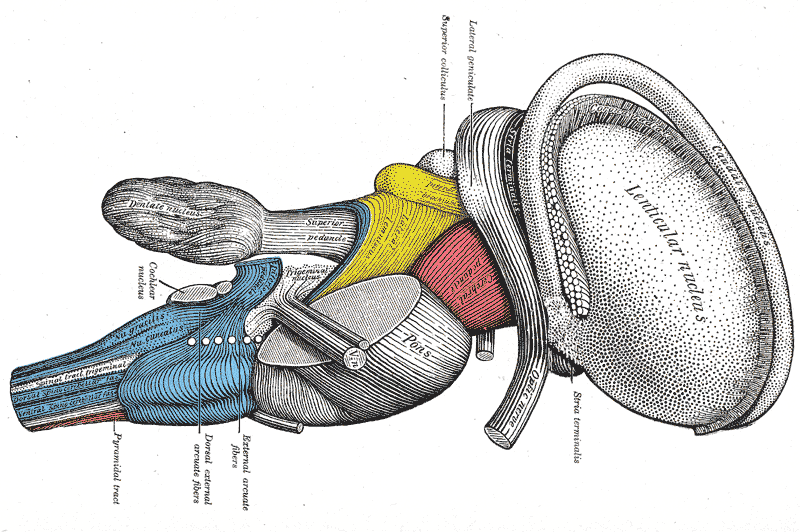
- Dissection of brain-stem. Lateral view (Stria terminalis labeled at upper right.).
- Bed nucleus of the stria terminalis of the mouse brain

Details

Identifiers
- Latin: stria terminalis
- NeuroNames: 286
- NeuroLex ID: birnlex_937
- TA98: A14.1.09.275
- TA2: 5592
- FMA: 61974

The stria terminalis (or terminal stria) is a structure in the brain consisting of a band of fibers running along the lateral margin of the ventricular surface of the thalamus. Serving as a major output pathway of the amygdala, the stria terminalis runs from its centromedial division to the ventromedial nucleus of the hypothalamus.

== Anatomy ==
The stria terminalis covers the superior thalamostriate vein, marking a line of separation between the thalamus and the caudate nucleus as seen upon gross dissection of the ventricles of the brain, viewed from the superior aspect.

The stria terminalis extends from the region of the interventricular foramina to the temporal horn of the lateral ventricle, carrying fibers from the amygdala to the septal nuclei, hypothalamic, and thalamic areas of the brain. It also carries fibers projecting from these areas back to the amygdala.

=== Bed nucleus of the stria terminalis ===
The bed nucleus of the stria terminalis (BNST) is a collection of nuclei at the base of the lateral ventricles, and in front of the septum. The BNST, hypothalamic nuclei, and septal nuclei are all in close proximity with each other and share many projections. It correlates with anxiety in response to threat monitoring. It is thought to act as a relay site within the hypothalamic-pituitary-adrenal axis and regulate its activity in response to acute stress. However, the stress response is time-related and the BNST does not activate for contextual fear. This means that a sudden scary situation that is under ten minutes long does not activate the BNST. It is also thought to promote behavioral inhibition in response to unfamiliar individuals, by input from the orbitofrontal cortex. Bilateral disruption of this pathway has been shown to attenuate reinstatement of drug seeking behaviour in rodents.

This nucleus is known to project inhibitory fibers to the lateral hypothalamus and participate in the control of feeding in rodents. Optogenetic activation of this inhibitory pathway rapidly produced voracious feeding behavior in well-fed mice and optogenetic inhibition of this pathway reduces food intake even in starved animals.

Derangement of opioid signaling in the BNST appears to mediate chronic alcohol-induced changes in stress response.

== Sexual dimorphism ==
The central subdivision of the bed nucleus of the stria terminalis (BSTc) is sexually dimorphic. On average, the BSTc is twice as large in men as in women and contains twice the number of somatostatin neurons. A sample of six post-mortem, long-term hormone replacement therapy (HRT) treated trans women (male-to-female) were found to have a female-typical number of cells in the BSTc, whereas a trans man (female-to-male) was found to have a male-typical number. The authors (Jiang-Ning Zhou, Frank PM Kruijver, Dick Swaab) also examined subjects with hormone-related disorders and found no pattern between those disorders and the BSTc while the single untreated male-to-female transsexual had a female-typical number of cells. They concluded that the BSTc provides evidence for a neurobiological basis of gender identity and proposed that such was determined before birth.

Hormone replacement therapy has been shown to influence hypothalamic size, even though the study tried to account for it by including non-transsexual male and female controls which, for a variety of medical reasons, had experienced hormone reversal. The neurobiological basis of gender has been questioned in a follow-up study by the same group which found that the sexual dimorphism of the BSTc is not significant until adulthood (approximately 22 years of age) even though epidemiological studies show much earlier presentation of gender issues.

Since somatostatin-expressing neurons typically block dendritic inputs to the postsynaptic neuron, thus inhibiting signals traveling through associated structures, it is believed that the larger bed nucleus of the stria terminalis found in men (including transgender men) reduce the startle response in men and may be responsible for the higher incidence of specific phobias in women, and a possible source for the stereotype of women being afraid of mice.

Oxytocin receptor activity in the BNST is important for social recognition in rats. Both male and female rats that received a microinjection of oxytocin receptor antagonist had lower social recognition scores than rats that received a vehicle injection, and microinjections of oxytocin into the BNST enhanced social memory in male, but not female, rats.

Reduction to the bed nucleus of the stria terminalis has been observed in pedophilia diagnosed patients, in addition to reductions in the right amygdala, hypothalamus and abnormalities in related structures. The authors suggest reductions in the BNST are not specific to pedophilia, and are a general feature of abnormal sexual development.
