= Interthalamic adhesion =

Band of tissue connecting the two halves of the thalamus

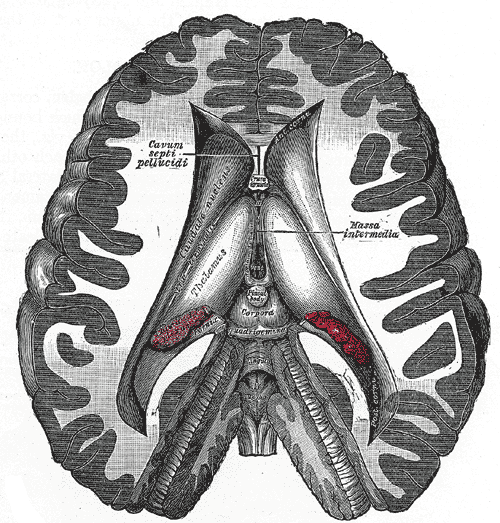
- Dissection showing the ventricles of the brain. (Interthalamic adhesion labeled as Massa Intermedia at center right.)

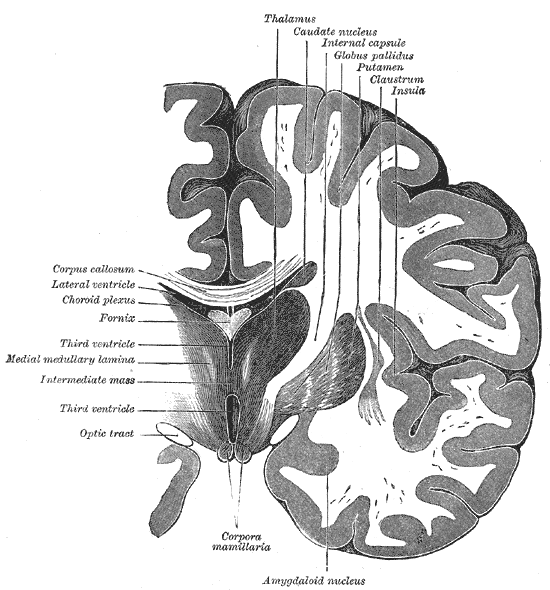
- Coronal section of brain through intermediate mass of third ventricle.

Details
- Part of: Thalamus

Identifiers
- Latin: adhaesio interthalamica
- NeuroNames: 301
- NeuroLex ID: nlx_144100
- TA98: A14.1.08.103
- TA2: 5778
- FMA: 74869

The interthalamic adhesion (also known as the massa intermedia, intermediate mass or middle commissure) is a flattened band of tissue that connects both parts of the thalamus at their medial surfaces. The medial surfaces form the upper part of the lateral wall to the third ventricle.

In humans, it is only about one centimeter long – though in females, it is about 50% larger on average. Sometimes, it is in two parts – and 20% of the time, it is absent. In other mammals, it is larger.

In 1889, a Portuguese anatomist by the name of Macedo examined 215 brains, showing that male humans are approximately twice as likely to lack an interthalamic adhesion as are female humans. He also reported its absence, still reported today in about 20% of humans. Its absence is seen to be of no consequence.

The interthalamic adhesion contains nerve cells and nerve fibers; a few of the latter may cross the middle line, making it a commissure in at least a portion of people, but many fibers pass toward the middle line and then curve laterally on the same side.

The interthalamic adhesion is notably enlarged in patients with the type II Arnold–Chiari malformation.

== Additional images ==
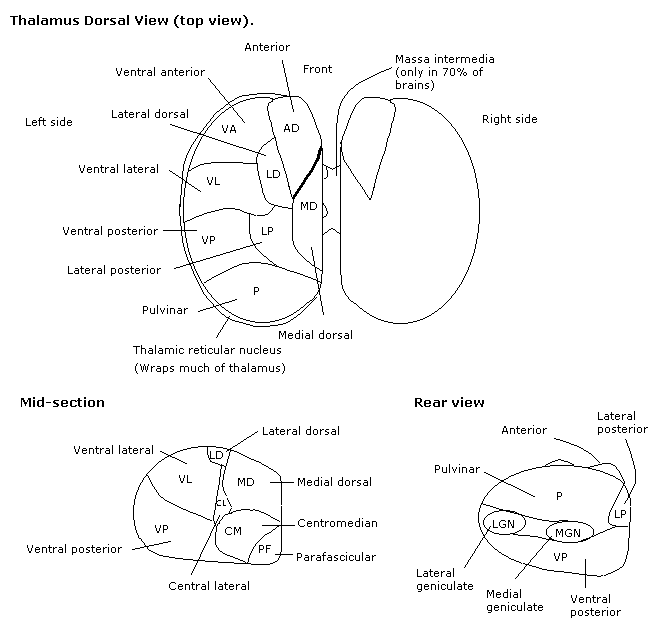
Thalamus

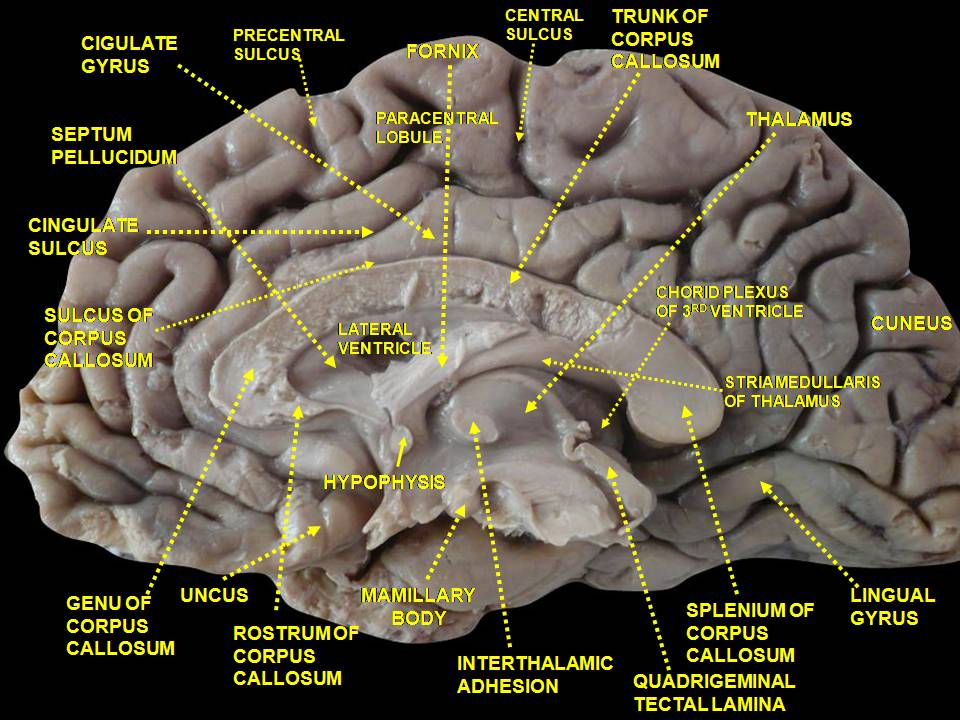
Medial surface of cerebral hemisphere. Medial view. Deep dissection.
