= Lamina cribrosa =

Lamina cribrosa may refer to:

- Cribriform plate of the ethmoid bone (horizontal lamina or lamina cribrosa ossis ethmoidalis)
- Lamina cribrosa sclerae, a mesh-like structures which allows nerve fibres of the optic nerve to pass through the sclera

== See also ==
- Lamina (anatomy)
