= Aegyrcitherium =

Aegyrcitherium Temporal range: Miocene

Scientific classification
- Domain: Eukaryota
- Kingdom: Animalia
- Phylum: Chordata
- Class: Mammalia
- Order: Perissodactyla
- Family: Rhinocerotidae
- Subfamily: Rhinocerotinae
- Genus: †Aegyrcitherium; Antoine, 1997

Type species
- Aegyrcitherium beonensis Antoine, 1997

Extinct genus of mammals

Aegyrcitherium is an extinct genus of prehistoric rhinoceros endemic to Europe during the Miocene living from 16.9—16 mya existing for approximately 0.9 million years.

== Taxonomy ==
Aegyrcitherium was named by Antoine (1997), who assigned one species to the genus, A. beonensis. It was reranked as Hispanotherium (Aegyrcitherium) by Guérin and Pickford (2003). It was assigned to Elasmotheriini by Antoine et al. (2000) and Deng (2003); and to Hispanotherium by Guérin and Pickford (2003).
