= Lamina (anatomy) =

Anatomical feature

Lamina is a general anatomical term meaning "plate" or "layer". It is used in both gross anatomy and microscopic anatomy to describe structures.

Some examples include:

- The laminae of the thyroid cartilage: two leaf-like plates of cartilage that make up the walls of the structure.
- The vertebral laminae: plates of bone that form the posterior walls of each vertebra, enclosing the spinal cord.
- The laminae of the thalamus: the layers of thalamus tissue.
- The lamina propria: a connective tissue layer under the epithelium of an organ.
- The nuclear lamina: a dense fiber network inside the nucleus of cells.
- The lamina affixa: a layer of epithelium growing on the surface of the thalamus.
- The lamina of Drosophila is the most peripheral neuropil of the insect visual system.
- Lamina cribrosa with two different meanings.
- Osseous spiral lamina, a feature of the bony canal of the cochlea
