= Deep cerebral veins =

Group of veins in the head

Details

Identifiers
- Latin: venae profundae cerebri
- TA98: A12.3.06.017
- TA2: 4915
- FMA: 70871

The deep cerebral veins are a group of veins in the head.

This group includes the superior thalamostriate vein.
