= Interventricular foramina (neuroanatomy) =

Structures within the human brain

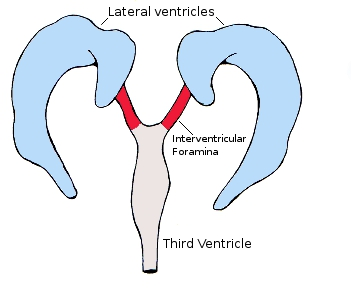
- The lateral ventricles connected to the third ventricle by the interventricular foramina.

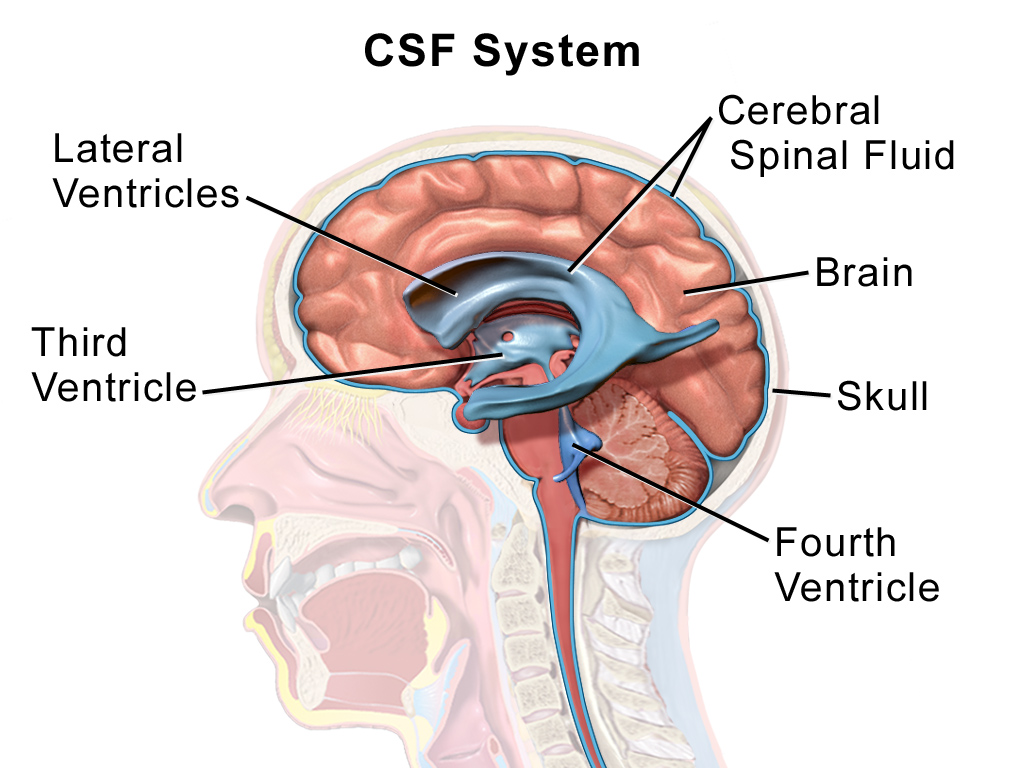
- Cerebrospinal fluid is present in spaces in and around the brain.

Details
- Part of: Ventricular system

Identifiers
- Latin: foramen interventriculare, foramen Monroi
- NeuroNames: 447
- TA98: A14.1.08.411
- TA2: 5641
- FMA: 75351

In the brain, the interventricular foramina (foramina of Monro) are channels that connect the paired lateral ventricles with the third ventricle at the midline of the brain. As channels, they allow cerebrospinal fluid (CSF) produced in the lateral ventricles to reach the third ventricle and then the rest of the brain's ventricular system. The walls of the interventricular foramina also contain choroid plexus, a specialized CSF-producing structure, that is continuous with that of the lateral and third ventricles above and below it.

== Structure ==
The interventricular foramina are two holes (Latin: foramen, pl. foramina) that connect the left and the right lateral ventricles to the third ventricle. They are located on the underside near the midline of the lateral ventricles, and join the third ventricle where its roof meets its anterior surface. In front of the foramen is the fornix and behind is the thalamus. The foramen is normally crescent-shaped, but rounds and increases in size depending on the size of the lateral ventricles.

=== Development ===
The development and shape of the ventricular system relates to the differential development of different parts of the brain, with the ventricular system ultimately arising from the neural tube. The lateral ventricles remain connected to the third ventricle throughout development, themselves developing as outpouchings from the third ventricle. The foramina develop slowly in a forward and outward direction as the fornix grows in size.

== Function ==
The interventricular foramina connect the lateral ventricles to the third ventricle. This allows cerebrospinal fluid produced in the lateral ventricles to reach the third ventricle and then the rest of the brain's ventricular system.

The walls of the interventricular foramina contain choroid plexus, a specialized structure that produces cerebrospinal fluid. The choroid plexus of the third ventricles continues through the foramina into the lateral ventricles.

End branches of the medial posterior choroidal arteries, superior thalamostriate, superior choroid veins and septal veins also pass through the foramina.

== Clinical significance ==
The interventricular foramina give rise to disease when they are narrowed or blocked. Narrowing of the foramen is more common in children and linked to: inflammation and scarring from congenital infections, particularly TORCH infections; developmental abnormalities, including of the basilar artery and choroid plexus; and abnormal surrounding tissue growths, such as colloid cysts, subependymal giant-cell tumours, nodules and harmatomas.

The most common symptom of blockage is headache; other symptoms include fainting, dementia, and coma, all of which are associated with obstructive hydrocephalus of the affected side or sides. Hydrocephalus can be identified by a CT scan or MRI scan of the brain, and treatment involves a neurosurgical operation in which an endoscope (i.e., a tiny camera and tools) is used to widen the foramen or create a new opening through the septum pellucidum between the lateral ventricles. If an obstructing mass is too large or too difficult to remove endoscopically, an open operation or the insertion of an artificial path between the ventricles and peritoneum may be required. Because of the intimate nature of pathways within the brain, such operations may result in damage to nearby structures, with complications including anterograde amnesia, inability to move half the body, akinetic mutism and disconnection syndromes.

== History ==
The foramina were named after the Scottish physician and University of Edinburgh graduate Alexander Monro, who first described an enlarged foramen in the context of hydrocephalus in a presentation to the Philosophical Society of Edinburgh in 1764, and subsequently in his 1783 publication, Observations on the Structure and Functions of the Nervous System.

In this publication, Monro notes that the ventricular system has been noted to be connected, implying the presence of the foramen, since the time of the physician anatomist Galen. Monro described it as:

... an oval hole, large enough to admit a goose quill, under forepart of the fornix. From this hole, a probe can be readily passed into the other lateral ventricle, shewing [sic], in the first place that the two lateral ventricles communicate with each other

Monro's original description, of two lateral ventricles joined by a foramen that then joined the third ventricle, is in fact incorrect. As noted by Monro himself, previous authors have also described the ventricles as having connections; consequently, the eponym of "Monro" has been disputed.
