= Internal cerebral veins =

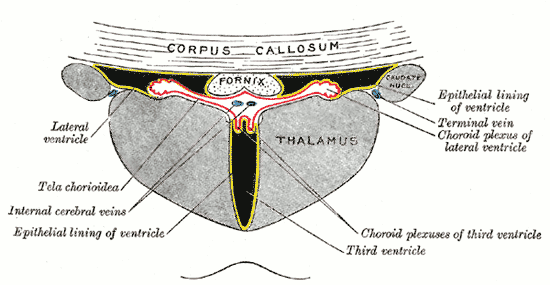
- Coronal section of lateral and third ventricles.

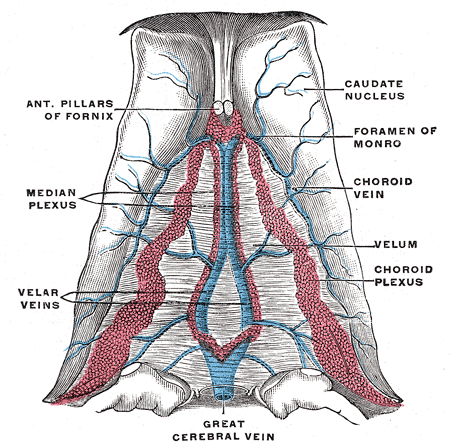
- Velum interpositum. (Internal cerebral veins labeled as velar veins.)

Details
- Drains to: Great cerebral vein
- Artery: Cerebral arteries

Identifiers
- Latin: venae internae cerebri
- TA98: A12.3.06.028
- TA2: 4923
- FMA: 70876

The internal cerebral veins are two veins included in the group of deep cerebral veins that drain the deep parts of the hemispheres; each internal cerebral vein is formed near the interventricular foramina by the union of the superior thalamostriate vein and the superior choroid vein.

They run backward parallel with one another, between the layers of the tela chorioidea of the third ventricle, and beneath the splenium of the corpus callosum, where they unite to form a short trunk, the great cerebral vein of Galen; just before their union each receives the corresponding basal vein.
