= Third ventricle =

Structure within the human brain

- Third ventricle shown in red

- Blue – lateral ventricles Cyan – interventricular foramina (Monro); Yellow – third ventricle Red – cerebral aqueduct (Sylvius); Purple – fourth ventricle Green – continuous with the central canal (apertures to subarachnoid space are not visible)

Details

Identifiers
- Latin: ventriculus tertius cerebri
- MeSH: D020542
- NeuroNames: 446
- NeuroLex ID: birnlex_714
- TA98: A14.1.08.410
- TA2: 5769
- FMA: 78454

The third ventricle is one of the four connected cerebral ventricles of the ventricular system within the mammalian brain. It is a slit-like cavity formed in the diencephalon between the two thalami, in the midline between the right and left lateral ventricles, and is filled with cerebrospinal fluid (CSF).

Running through the third ventricle is the interthalamic adhesion, which contains thalamic neurons and fibers that may connect the two thalami.

== Structure ==
The third ventricle is a narrow, laterally flattened, vaguely rectangular region, filled with cerebrospinal fluid, and lined by ependyma. It is connected at the superior anterior corner to the lateral ventricles, by the interventricular foramina, and becomes the cerebral aqueduct (aqueduct of Sylvius) at the posterior caudal corner. Since the interventricular foramina are on the lateral edge, the corner of the third ventricle itself forms a bulb, known as the anterior recess (it is also known as the bulb of the ventricle). The roof of the ventricle comprises choroid plexus, forming the inferior central portion of the tela choroidea; immediately above the superior central portion of the tela choroidea is the fornix.

The lateral side of the ventricle is marked by a sulcus – the hypothalamic sulcus – from the inferior side of the interventricular foramina to the anterior side of the cerebral aqueduct. The lateral border posterior/superior of the sulcus constitutes the thalamus, while anterior/inferior of the sulcus it constitutes the hypothalamus. The interthalamic adhesion usually tunnels through the thalamic portion of the ventricle, joining together the left and right halves of the thalamus, although it is sometimes absent, or split into more than one tunnel through the ventricle; it is currently unknown whether any nerve fibres pass between the left and right thalamus via the adhesion (it has more resemblance to a herniation than a commissure).

The posterior border of the ventricle primarily constitutes the epithalamus. The superior part of the posterior border constitutes the habenular commissure, while more centrally it the pineal gland, which regulates sleep and reacts to light levels. Caudal of the pineal gland is the posterior commissure; nerve fibres reach the posterior commissure from the adjacent midbrain, but their onward connection is currently uncertain. The commissures create concavity to the shape of the posterior ventricle border, causing the suprapineal recess above the habenular, and the deeper pineal recess between the habenular and posterior commissures; the recesses being so-named due to the pineal recess being bordered by the pineal gland.

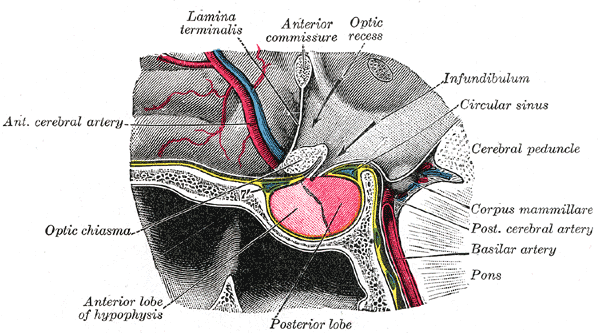
The hypothalmic portion of the third ventricle (upper right), and surrounding structures

The anterior wall of the ventricle forms the lamina terminalis, within which the vascular organ monitors and regulates the osmotic concentration of the blood; the cerebrum lies beyond the lamina, and causes it to have a slightly concave shape. The optic recess – marks the inferior end of the lamina terminalis, with the optic chiasm forming the immediately adjacent floor.

The portion of the floor immediately posterior of the optic chiasm distends inferiorly, and slightly anteriorly, to form a funnel (the infundibulum); the recess leading to the funnel is known as the infundibular recess. The border of the funnel is the tuber cinereum, which constitutes a bundle of nerve fibres from the hypothalamus. The funnel ends in the posterior lobe of the pituitary gland, which is thus neurally connected to the hypothalamus via the tuber cinereum. A venous sinus (the circular sinus) surrounds the superior portion of the tuber cinereum; the circular sinus is in fact simply a portion of the two lateral cavernous sinuses, joined together by a posterior and anterior intercavernous sinus.

The mammillary bodies form the floor posterior of the tuber cinereum, acting as the link between the fornix and the hypothalamus. Posterior of the mamillary bodies, the ventricle becomes the opening of the cerebral aqueduct, the inferior borders becoming the crus cerebri (sometimes historically called the cerebral peduncle) of the midbrain.

== Development ==
The third ventricle, like other parts of the ventricular system of the brain, develops from the neural canal of the neural tube. Specifically, it originates from the most rostral portion of the neural tube which initially expands to become the prosencephalon. The lamina terminalis is the rostral termination of the neural tube. After about five weeks, different portions of the prosencephalon begin to take distinct developmental paths from one another – the more rostral portion becomes the telencephalon, while the more caudal portion becomes the diencephalon. The telencephalon gradually expands laterally to a much greater extent than it does dorsally or ventrally, and its connection to the remainder of the neural tube reduces to the interventricula foramina. The diencephalon expands more evenly, but caudally of the diencephalon the canal remains narrow. The third ventricle is the space formed by the expanding canal of the diencephalon.

The hypothalamic region of the ventricle develops from the ventral portion of the neural tube, while the thalamic region develops from the dorsal portion; the wall of the tube thickens and becomes the hypothalamus and thalamus respectively. The hypothalamic area of the ventricle begins to distend ventrally during the 5th week of development, creating the infundibulum and posterior pituitary; an outgrowth from the stomodeum (the future mouth) gradually extends towards it, to form the anterior pituitary.

The optic recess is noticeable by the end of the 6th week, by which time a bend is distinguishable in the dorsal portion of the ventricle border. Rostral of the bend, the medial dorsal portion of the ventricle begins to flatten, and become secretory (i.e. choroid plexus), forming the roof of the ventricle. Caudal of the bend, the ventricle border forms the epithalamus, and begins to distend towards the parietal bone (in lower vertebrates, it distends more specifically to the parietal eye); the border of the distention forms the pineal gland.

== Clinical significance ==
The floor of the third ventricle is formed by hypothalamic structures and this can be opened surgically between the mamillary bodies and the pituitary gland in a procedure called an endoscopic third ventriculostomy. An endoscopic third ventriculostomy can be performed in order to release extra fluid caused by hydrocephalus.

Several studies have found evidence of ventricular enlargement to be associated with major depression, particularly enlargement of the third ventricle. These observations are interpreted as indicating a loss of neural tissue in brain regions adjacent to the enlarged ventricle, leading to suggestions that cytokines and related mediators of neurodegeneration may play a role in giving rise to the disease.

A chordoid glioma is a rare tumour that can arise in the third ventricle.

== Additional images ==
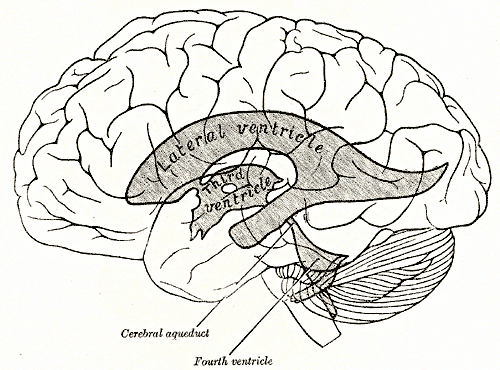
Third ventricle

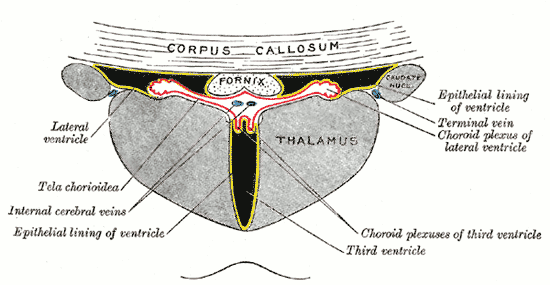
Coronal section of lateral and third ventricles.

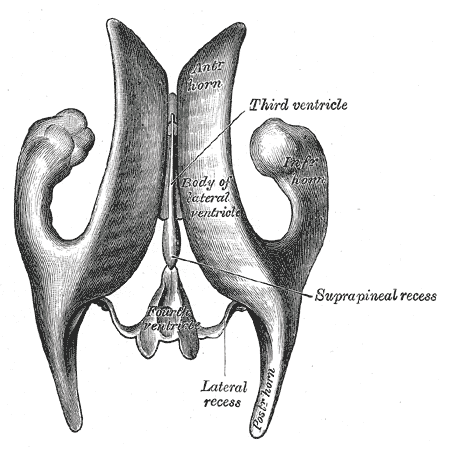
Drawing of a cast of the ventricular cavities, viewed from above.

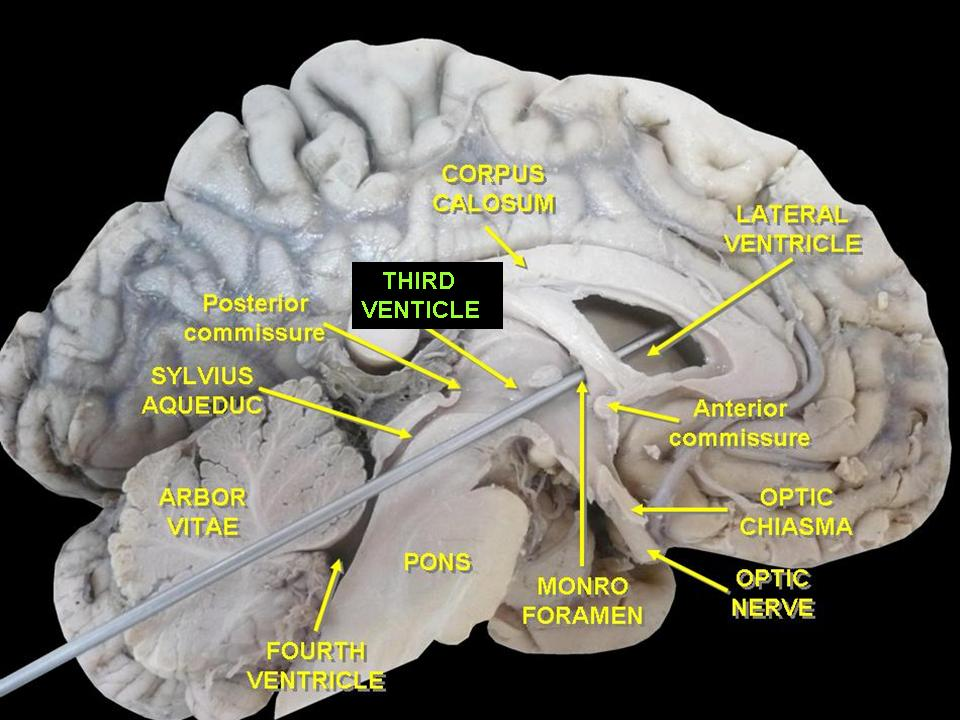
Third ventricle

== See also ==
- Biology of depression
- Suprapineal recess
- Tanycytes line the bottom of the ventricle
