= Choroid veins =

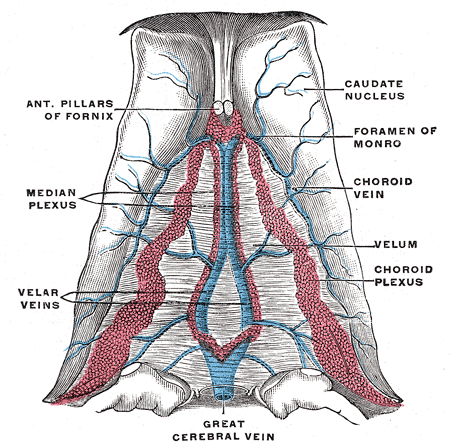

Details

Identifiers
- Latin: venae choroideae

The choroid veins are the superior choroid vein, and the inferior choroid vein of the lateral ventricle. Both veins drain different parts of the choroid plexus.

== Superior choroid vein ==
The superior choroid vein runs along the length of the choroid plexus in the lateral ventricle. It drains the choroid plexus, and also the hippocampus, fornix, and corpus callosum. It unites with the superior thalamostriate vein to form the internal cerebral vein.

== Inferior choroid vein ==
The inferior choroid vein drains the inferior choroid plexus into the basal vein.
