= Superior thalamostriate vein =

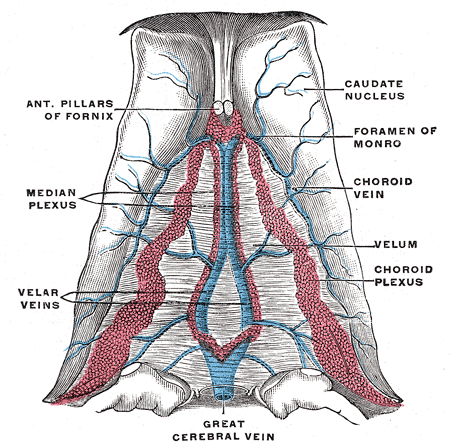
- Velum interpositum.

Details
- Drains to: Internal cerebral veins

Identifiers
- Latin: vena thalamostriata superior, vena terminalis, vena corporis striati
- TA98: A12.3.06.030
- TA2: 4925
- FMA: 50997

The superior thalamostriate vein or terminal vein commences in the groove between the corpus striatum and thalamus, receives numerous veins from both of these parts, and unites behind the crus of the fornix with the superior choroid vein to form each of the internal cerebral veins.
