= Perihypoglossal nuclei =

Three groups of neurons involved in controlling eye movement

Details

Identifiers
- Latin: nuclei perihypoglossales

Perihypoglossal nuclei (also perihypoglossal complex, perihypoglossal nuclear complex, or satellite nuclei) are three prominent groups of neurons in the caudal medulla oblongata near the hypoglossal nucleus: the nucleus prepositus hypoglossi, intercalated nucleus, and sublingual nucleus. They are involved in controlling eye movements: they send their principal projections to the three cranial nerve nuclei controlling extrinsic eye muscles via the medial longitudinal fasciculus.

== Anatomy ==
Perihypoglossal nuclei are a group of neurons in the floor of the fourth ventricle, close to the nucleus of the hypoglossal nerve in the gray substance of the medulla oblongata, all of which contain cells with characteristics suggestive of reticular connections.

=== Afferents ===
Perihypoglossal nuclei receive afferents from the cerebral cortex, vestibular nuclei, accessory oculomotor nuclei, and paramedian pontine reticular formation.

=== Efferents ===
The nuclei project principally to all three cranial nerve nuclei controlling extrinsic eye muscles (the oculomotor (CN III), trochlear (CN IV), and abducens (CN VI) nuclei) via the MLF, with additional efferents to the cerebellum, and thalamus.
