= Nucleus prepositus =

- Cross-section of lower pons, nucleus prepositus shown at #5 top left

Details

Identifiers
- Latin: nucleus prepositus hypoglossi
- NeuroLex ID: birnlex_2652

The nucleus prepositus or nucleus prepositus hypoglossi is one of the largest of the three perihypoglossal nuclei. It is situated in the caudal pons and rostral medulla oblongata. It contributes to several aspects of gaze control including the horizontal gaze holding system.

Injury to the nucleus prepositus results in inability to hold gaze upon a visual target; conjugate eye movement is unaffected.

It may be conceptually regarded as a vestibular nucleus.

== Anatomy ==
The nucleus prepositus is situated near the hypoglossal nucleus. It is continuous rostrally with the paramedian pontine reticular formation, and caudally with the intercalated nucleus. It is situated medial to the medial vestibular nucleus.

=== Connections ===
It is connected to the superior colliculus, and has reciprocal connections with the serotonergic raphe nuclei (thereby possibly participating in blood pressure regulation).

==== Afferents ====
It receives afferents from the frontal eye fields, medial and dorsal vestibular nuclei, paramedian pontine reticular formation, and interstitial nucleus of Cajal.

==== Efferents ====
The nuclei project principally to all three cranial nerve nuclei controlling extrinsic eye muscles (the oculomotor (CN III), trochlear (CN IV), and abducens (CN VI) nuclei) via the medial longitudinal fasciculus, with additional efferents to the vestibular nuclei, and vestibulocerebellum.

== Function ==
The nucleus prepositus integrates velocity-position information for horizontal eye movements to enable eccentric gaze. Tonic neurons of the nucleus (along with those of with the medial vestibular nucleus) are believed to maintain eccentric (i.e. off resting position) direction of gaze, counteracting forces pulling the eye back to its default, resting, straight-forward gazing position after saccades. The nucleus prepositus is thought to provide information about eye position.
