= Conjugate eye movement =

Conjugate eye movement refers to motor coordination of the eyes that allows for bilateral fixation on a single object. A conjugate eye movement is a movement of both eyes in the same direction to maintain binocular gaze (also referred to as “yoked” eye movement). This is in contrast to vergence eye movement, where binocular gaze is maintained by moving eyes in opposite directions, such as going “cross eyed” to view an object moving towards the face. Conjugate eye movements can be in any direction, and can accompany both saccadic eye movements and smooth pursuit eye movements.

Conjugate eye movements are used to change the direction of gaze without changing the depth of gaze. This can be used to either follow a moving object, or change focus entirely. When following a moving object, conjugate eye movements allow individuals to stabilize their perception of the moving object, and focus on the object rather than the rest of the visual world. When changing focus, conjugate eye movements allow for the perception of a stabilized world relative to an individual, rather than the perception of the world “jumping” as the individual’s gaze shifts. Without conjugate eye movements, there would be no synchronicity of the information obtained by each eye, so an individual would not be able to willingly move their eyes around a scene while still maintaining depth perception and scene or object stability.

Several centers in the brainstem are involved. Horizontal conjugate gaze is controlled by the nuclei of the Ocular Nerve, CN III, and the Abducens nerve, CN VI, the paramedian pontine reticular formation, and the nucleus prepositus hypoglossi-medial vestibular nucleus. Vertical conjugate gaze is controlled by the nuclei of CN III and the Trochlear nerve, CN IV, the rostral interstitial nucleus of medial longitudinal fasciculus (riMLF), and the interstitial nucleus of Cajal.

Disorders of conjugate gaze typically consist of the inability to move one or both eyes in the desired direction, or the inability to prevent eyes from making vergence movements.

Conjugate gaze palsy: Conjugate gaze palsies typically affect horizontal gaze, although some affect upward gaze. Few affect downward gaze. These effects can range in severity from a complete lack of voluntary eye movement to mild impairments in speed, accuracy or range of eye movement.

Internuclear ophthalmoplegia: Internuclear ophthalmoplegia affects horizontal gaze, such that one eye is capable of full horizontal movement, while the other is incapable of gazing in the direction contralateral to the affected eye.

One and a half syndrome: “One and a half syndrome” also affects horizontal gaze. One eye is completely incapable of horizontal movement, while the other eye is capable of horizontal movement only in one direction away from the midline.

== See also ==
- Gaze (physiology)
