= Corticomesencephalic tract =

- The picture shows Brodmann's area 8, the origin of the corticomesencephalic tract

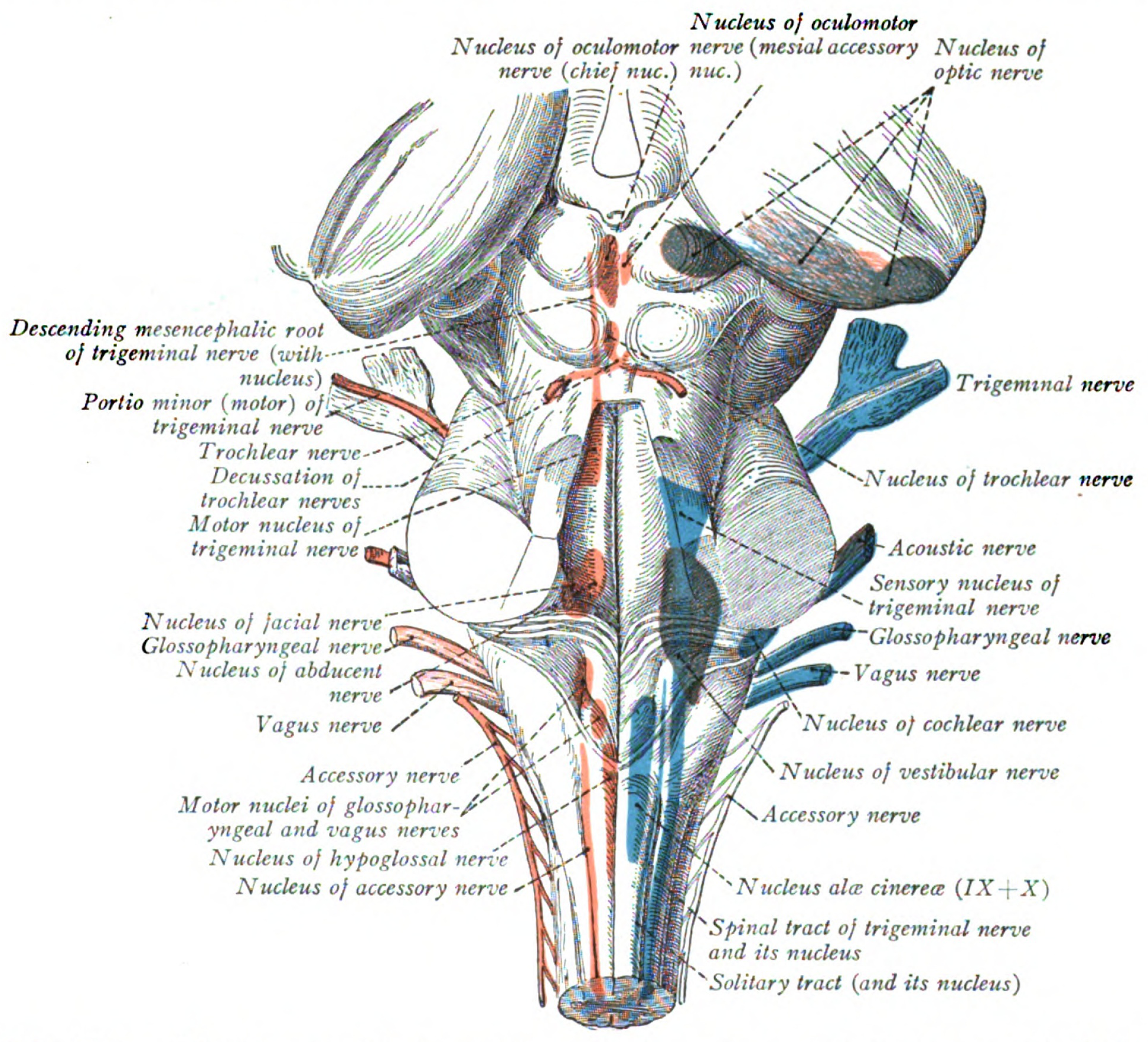
- The picture shows the nuclei of the oculomotor and trochlear nerves, the locations where the fibers of the corticomesencephalic tract terminate.

Details

Identifiers
- Latin: tractus corticomesencephalis

In neuroanatomy, corticomesencephalic tract is a descending nerve tract that originates in the frontal eye field (Brodmann area 8) and terminates in the midbrain. Its fibers mediate conjugate eye movement.

== Structure ==
The corticomesencephalic tract originates from the frontal eye field in the caudal part of the middle frontal gyrus and the inferior frontal gyrus (Brodmann's area 8). It runs rostral to the pyramidal tract in the posterior limb of the internal capsule. Then, it courses posteriorly toward the nuclei of the oculomotor nerve (III), trochlear nerve (IV) and abducens nerve (VI), the three cranial nerves that mediate eye movements. At the level of the caudal midbrain, corticomesencephalic fibers descend through the tegmentum in the medial lemniscus toward the oculomotor (III) and the trochlear (IV) nuclei on the contralateral (opposite) side. However, the fibers to the abducens (VI) nucleus do not terminate directly onto the nucleus. Instead, they terminate onto the paramedian pontine reticular formation (PPRF). The PPRF contains excitatory “burst” neurons that transmit the pulse to the ipsilateral (the same side of the body) abducens nucleus.

== Function ==
The fibers of the corticomesencephalic tracts are involved in the control of the conjugate eye movement. The fibers to the oculomotor (III) nucleus control the medial rectus, superior rectus, inferior rectus, and inferior oblique muscles. Fibers to the trochlear (IV) nucleus control the superior oblique muscle. Fibers to the paramedian pontine reticular formation (PPRF) project to the abducens (VI) nucleus, which controls the movement of the lateral rectus muscle. Also, fibers to the paramedian pontine reticular formation mediates the movements with the oculomotor (III) and trochlear (IV) nerves through the medial longitudinal fasciculus (MLF). The MLF coordinates the interaction between the oculomotor (III) and the abducens (VI) nuclei, which create bilateral conjugate horizontal eye movements.

== Additional images ==
Cross section of the midbrain at the level of the superior colliculus showing oculomotor nucleus .

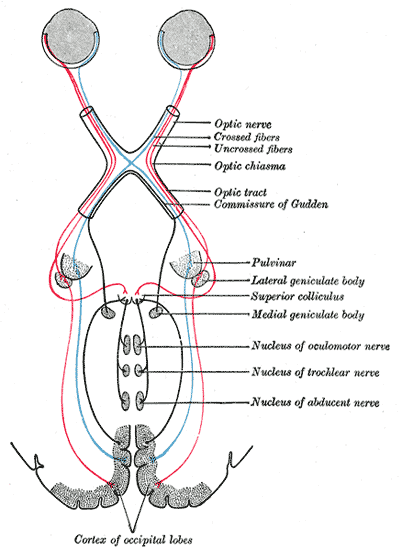
Scheme showing central connections of the optic nerves and optic tracts.

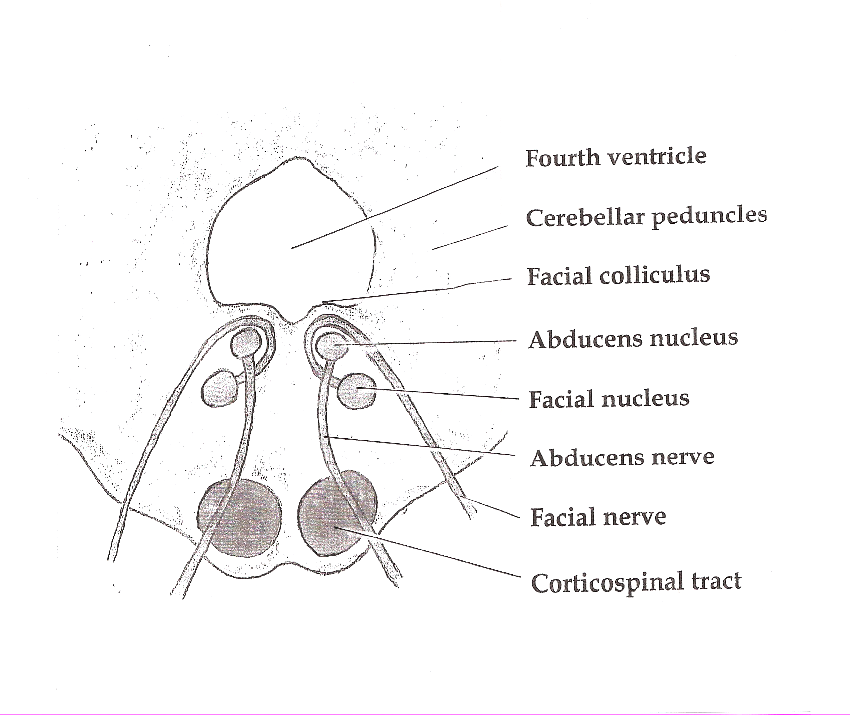
Cross section of the pons at the level of the facial colliculus. PPRF is not labeled, but is visible adjacent to the abducens nucleus

== See also ==
- Frontal eye field
- Cranial nerves
- Pyramidal tracts
