= Vestibulo-oculomotor fibers =

Group of nerves in the brainstem

Identifiers
- NeuroNames: 1346

The vestibulo-oculomotor fibers are the portion of the medial longitudinal fasciculus which ascends to the oculomotor nucleus from the vestibular nuclei.

== See also ==
- Vestibulo-ocular reflex
