= Nucleus of the posterior commissure =

Details
- Location: Midbrain

The nucleus of the posterior commissure is one of the accessory oculomotor nuclei situated in the mesencephalon (midbrain) at its junction with the diencephalon. It is involved in coordinating head-eye movements (particularly vertical conjugate eye movements (gaze)). It is situated near the oculomotor nucleus. It is thought to receive afferents from the ipsilateral cerebellum.
