= Nucleus of Darkschewitsch =

Details
- Location: Midbrain

The nucleus of Darkschewitsch is an accessory oculomotor nucleus situated in the ventrolateral portion of the periaqueductal gray of the mesencephalon (midbrain) near its junction with the diencephalon. It is involved in mediating vertical eye movements. It projects to the trochlear nucleus, receives afferents from the visual cortex, and forms a reciprocal (looping) connection with the cerebellum by way of the inferior olive.

== Anatomy ==
=== Connections ===
It receives afferents from the visual association areas (via the corticotectal tract), vestibular nuclei (via the medial longitudinal fasciculus), and from the spinomesencephalic tract.

It gives rise to the medial tegmental tract to project efferents to the (rostral portion of) medial accessory olivary nucleus → ((decussation) inferior cerebellar peduncle → (contralateral) globose nucleus of cerebellum → superior cerebellar peduncle (decussation) → (rostral part of) medial accessory olivary nucleus → (ipsilateral) nucleus of Darkschewitsch).

It projects (directly or indirectly) to the trochlear nucleus.

=== Relations ===
It is situated near the oculomotor nucleus. It is situated just dorsomedial to the interstitial nucleus of Cajal, the medial longitudinal fasciculus, and red nucleus.
