= Internuclear ophthalmoplegia =

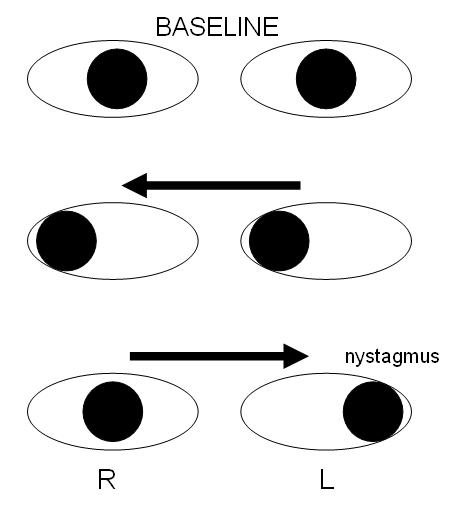
- Schematic demonstrating right internuclear ophthalmoplegia, caused by injury of the right medial longitudinal fasciculus.
- Specialty: Ophthalmology

Internuclear ophthalmoplegia (INO) is a disorder of conjugate lateral gaze in which the affected eye shows impairment of adduction. When an attempt is made to gaze contralaterally (relative to the affected eye), the affected eye adducts minimally, if at all. The contralateral eye abducts, however with nystagmus. Additionally, the divergence of the eyes leads to horizontal diplopia. That is if the right eye is affected the patient will "see double" when looking to the left, seeing two images side-by-side. Convergence is generally preserved.

== Causes ==
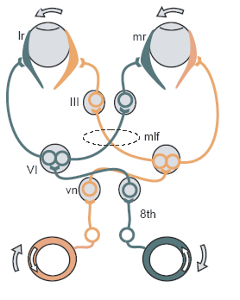
Vestibulo-ocular reflex

The disorder is caused by injury or dysfunction in the medial longitudinal fasciculus (MLF), a heavily myelinated tract that allows conjugate eye movement by connecting the paramedian pontine reticular formation (PPRF)-abducens nucleus complex of the contralateral side to the oculomotor nucleus of the ipsilateral side.

In young patients with bilateral INO, multiple sclerosis is often the cause. In older patients with one-sided lesions a stroke is a distinct possibility. Other causes are possible.

== Variants ==
A rostral lesion within the midbrain may affect the convergence center thus causing bilateral divergence of the eyes which is known as the WEBINO syndrome (Wall Eyed Bilateral INO) as each eye looks at the opposite "wall".

If the lesion affects the PPRF (or the abducens nucleus) and the MLF on the same side (the MLF having crossed from the opposite side), then the "one and a half syndrome" occurs, with paralysis of all conjugate horizontal eye movements other than abduction of the eye on the opposite side to the lesion.

== Diagnosis ==
Can be seen in multiple sclerosis, stroke, and other pathologies. Accompanying symptoms include scanning speech, intention tremor, incontinence, and nystagmus.

== See also ==
- Multiple sclerosis
- One and a half syndrome
- Wall-eyed monocular internuclear ophthalmoplegia (WEMINO)
