= Rostral interstitial nucleus of medial longitudinal fasciculus =

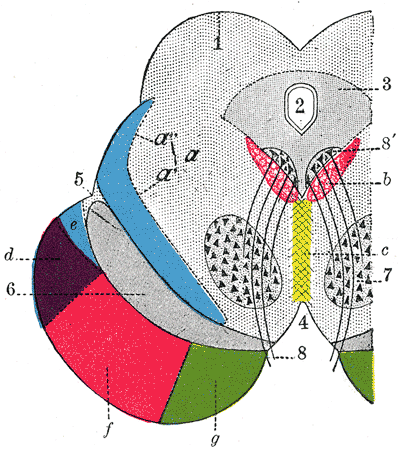
- Axial section through mid-brain. (Nucleus is not labeled, but MLF is "b", in red.)

Details

Identifiers
- Latin: nucleus interstitialis
- NeuroNames: 516
- NeuroLex ID: birnlex_1481

The rostral interstitial nucleus of medial longitudinal fasciculus (riMLF) is a collection of neurons in the medial longitudinal fasciculus in the midbrain. It is responsible for mediating vertical conjugate eye movements (vertical gaze) and vertical saccades. It mostly projects efferents to the ipsilateral oculomotor and trochlear nuclei.

To mediate downgaze, it projects efferents to the ipsilateral oculomotor nucleus and trochlear nucleus; mediate upgaze, it projects efferents to the contralateral aforementioned nuclei through the posterior commissure.

It is one of the accessory oculomotor nuclei.

== Anatomy ==
=== Structure ===
The riMLF is a wing-shaped nucleus.

The riMLF contains two populations of neurons: excitatory burst neurons mediating vertical gaze/saccades, as well as omnipause neurons which are functionally similar to those mediating horizontal gaze.

=== Relations ===
It is situated at the caudal extremity of the mesencephalon at its junction with the telencephalon, at the level of the superior colliculus. It is situated dorsal to the rostral extremity of the red nucleus, and rostral to the interstitial nucleus of Cajal.

== Clinical significance ==
Lesions of the riMLF may impair vertical gaze completely, or predominantly impair downgaze. Lesions of the posterior commissure meanwhile disrupt upgaze.

== See also ==
- Interstitial nucleus of Cajal - another structure involved in vertical gaze (including torsional gaze and gaze holding, but not saccades).
- Paramedian pontine reticular formation - the horizontal gaze center.
