= Interstitial nucleus of Cajal =

Details
- System: Oculomotor system
- Location: Midbrain
- Function: Head-eye movement coordination (especially vertical gaze)

The interstitial nucleus of Cajal is a collection of neurons in the mesencephalon (midbrain) which are involved in integrating eye position-velocity information in order to coordinate head-eye movements - especially those related to vertical and torsional conjugate eye movements (gaze). It also mediates vertical gaze holding.

Bilateral projections to the oculomotor (cranial nerve III) and trochlear (cranial nerve IV) nuclei represent its principal outputs. It forms reciprocal connections with vestibular nuclei. It also has additional afferents and efferents. Some of the nucleus' connections pass through the medial longitudinal fasciculus, and the posterior commissure.

It is one of the accessory oculomotor nuclei.

== Anatomy ==
The interstitial nucleus of Cajal is a diffuse collection of mid-sized, parvalbumin-containing premotor neurons of the midbrain reticular formation.

=== Connections ===
The nucleus forms reciprocal connections with the vestibular nuclei (through the MLF). It forms connections with the ipsilateral rostral interstitial nucleus of medial longitudinal fasciculus. Some of its contralateral connections cross over the posterior commissure.

==== Afferents ====
It receives afferents (in fact, forms reciprocal connections) with the vestibular nuclei (via the MLF), and the nucleus prepositus hypoglossi.

It receives afferents from the spinal cord through the spinomesencephalic tract.

It receives afferents from the visual association areas via the corticotectal tract.

==== Efferents ====
It projects bilaterally to the oculomotor (cranial nerve III) nucleus, and trochlear (cranial nerve IV) nucleus; these are the nucleus' major efferents.

It projects descending efferents through the medial longitudinal fasciculus to (all levels of) the spinal cord (via the interstitiospinal tract), the ipsilateral superior and medial vestibular nuclei, the nucleus prepositus hypoglossi, and reticular formation.

=== Relations ===
It is situated in the dorsomedial portion of the rostral mesencephalic tegmentum near its junction with the diencephalon, in between the (midline) periaqueductal gray and (ipsilateral) red nucleus, near the oculomotor nucleus, caudal to the rostral interstitial nucleus of medial longitudinal fasciculus, and ventrolateral to the nucleus of Darkschewitsch. Its neurons are situated lateral to - as well as scattered among the fibers of - the medial longitudinal fasciculus. It is situated at the rostral extremity of the medial longitudinal fasciculus (MLF).

== Function ==
The nucleus is one of the accessory oculomotor nuclei. It conciliates information regarding eye position and eye velocity in order to coordinate head-eye movements - especially those related to vertical and torsional/oblique gaze. "Tonic" neurons within and around the interstitial nucleus of Cajal mediate vertical gaze holding (whereas "burst" neurons of the riMLF mediate vertical saccades).

== See also ==
- Rostral interstitial nucleus of medial longitudinal fasciculus - related nucleus also involved in vertical gaze, but also mediating vertical saccades.
