= Interstitiospinal tract =

Details

Identifiers
- Latin: tractus interstitiospinalis
- TA98: A14.1.02.210; A14.1.04.127; A14.1.05.330
- FMA: 77031

In the human central nervous system, the interstitiospinal tract is one of ten descending neuronal tracts in humans that provides motor control to specific upper cervical somatic segments. The origin of this uncrossed tract is in the interstitial nucleus of Cajal (related to the oculomotor nucleus) which is subsequently found in the Edinger-Westphal nucleus of the midbrain. This tract also contributes to the make-up of the medial longitudinal fasciculus (MLF). Within the terminal segments of the upper cervical segments the interstitiospinal tract synapses in rexed laminae VII and VIII. It is believed to function in head and neck reflex movements in response to primarily visual and possibly vestibular stimuli.
