= Posterior commissure =

Part of the human brain

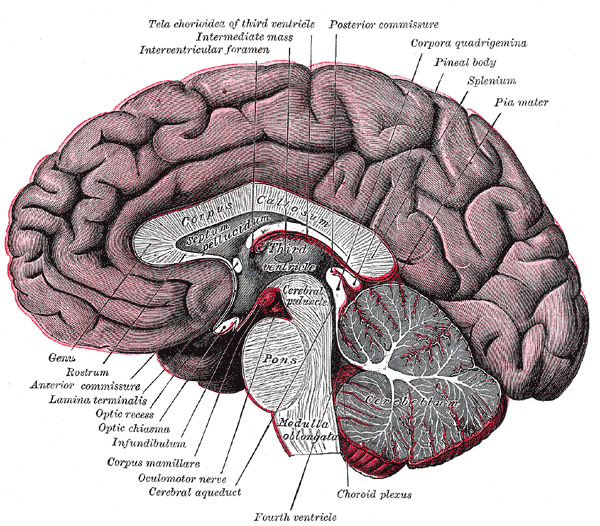
- Sagittal cross-section of the human brain. The posterior commissure is labelled at center top.

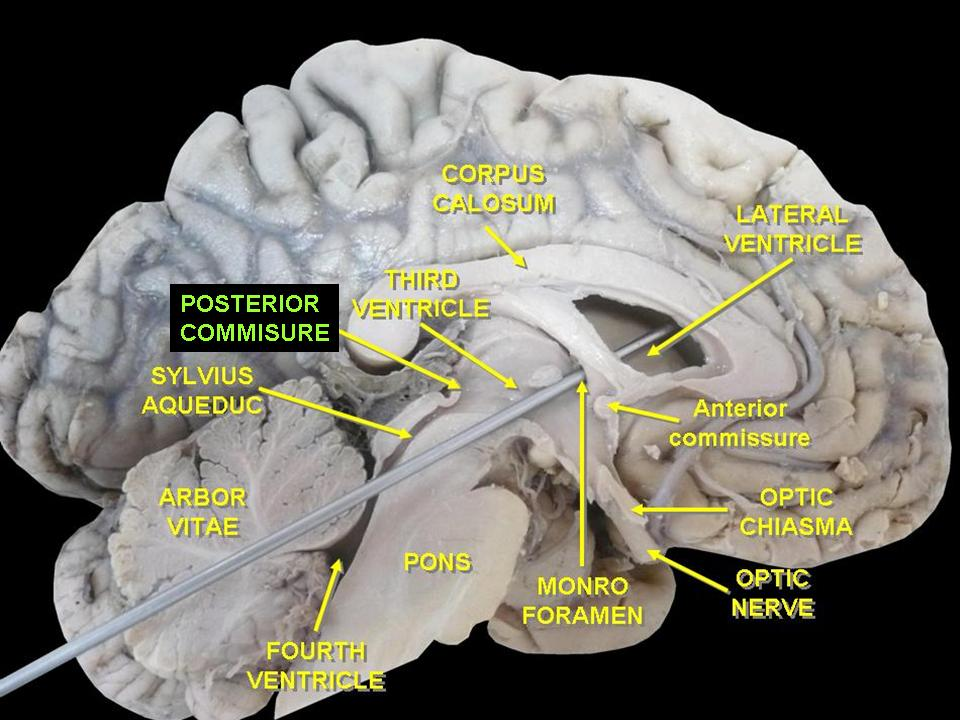
- The posterior commissure labelled on a human brain

Details
- Part of: Human brain

Identifiers
- Latin: commissura posterior
- MeSH: D066243
- NeuroNames: 484
- NeuroLex ID: birnlex_1026
- TA98: A14.1.08.416
- TA2: 5749
- FMA: 62072

The posterior commissure (also known as the epithalamic commissure) is a rounded band of white fibers crossing the middle line on the dorsal aspect of the rostral end of the cerebral aqueduct. It is important in the bilateral pupillary light reflex. It constitutes part of the epithalamus.

Its fibers acquire their medullary sheaths early, but their connections have not been definitively determined. Most of them have their origin in a nucleus, the nucleus of the posterior commissure (nucleus of Darkschewitsch), which lies in the periaqueductal grey at rostral end of the cerebral aqueduct, in front of the oculomotor nucleus. Some are thought to be derived from the posterior part of the thalamus and from the superior colliculus, whereas others are believed to be continued downward into the medial longitudinal fasciculus.

For the pupillary light reflex, the olivary pretectal nucleus innervates both Edinger-Westphal nuclei. To reach the contralateral Edinger-Westphal nucleus, the axons cross in the posterior commissure.
