= Accessory oculomotor nuclei =

The accessory oculomotor nuclei are a group of nuclei situated in the rostral mesencephalon (midbrain) near its junction with the diencephalon, and consist of:

- Interstitial nucleus of Cajal
- Rostral interstitial nucleus of medial longitudinal fasciculus
- Nucleus of Darkschewitsch
- Nucleus of the posterior commissure

These nuclei are involved in vertical and rotatory gaze (physiology), and smooth pursuit. They receive afferents from the visual association area; they project efferents through the medial longitudinal fasciculus to the nuclei of cranial nerves controlling extrinsic eye muscles.
