= Abducent =

Abducent may refer to:

- An anatomical term for a structure that is drawing away from the median axis of the body
- Abducens nerve
