= Fixation reflex =

The fixation reflex is that concerned with attracting the eye on a peripheral object. For example, when a light shines in the periphery, the eyes shift gaze on it. It is controlled by the occipital lobe of the cerebral cortex, corroborated by three main tests:

1. Removal of cortex causes shutdown of this reflex
2. Drawing a figure on the cortex surface will cause eye movements in the direction traveled
3. Detecting an image by recording the actual signals from the eyes

Older research declares that a motor pathway from the occipital cortex to the brainstem motor neurons was via the superior colliculi. This is the case in lower animals, but in humans, the theory that eye-muscle nuclei (oculomotor nucleus and Edinger–Westphal nucleus) aside from the superior colliculi of the midbrain is now generally held.

When an object is focused directly at an object but the eyes drift off their target, the fixation reflex keeps the eyes focused on the original object, albeit moving itself.

== See also ==
- Fixation (visual) – Maintaining one's gaze on a single location
- Nystagmus – Dysfunction of eye movement
- Saccade – Eye movement
- Vestibulo-ocular reflex – Reflex where rotation of the head causes eye movement to stabilize vision
- Oculomotor nerve – Cranial nerve III, for eye movements
- Oculomotor nucleus – Cluster of neurons in the midbrain
- Edinger–Westphal nucleus – One of two nuclei of the oculomotor nerve
- Ciliary ganglion – Bundle of nerves, parasympathetic ganglion
