= Conjugate gaze palsy =

- Specialty: Neurology

Conjugate gaze palsies are neurological disorders affecting the ability to move both eyes in the same direction. These palsies can affect gaze in a horizontal, upward, or downward direction. These entities overlap with ophthalmoparesis and ophthalmoplegia.

== Signs and symptoms ==
Symptoms of conjugate gaze palsies include the impairment of gaze in various directions and different types of movement, depending on the type of gaze palsy. Signs of a person with a gaze palsy may be frequent movement of the head instead of the eyes. For example, a person with a horizontal saccadic (saccade) palsy may jerk their head around while watching a movie or high action event instead of keeping their head steady and moving their eyes, which usually goes unnoticed. Someone with a nonselective horizontal gaze palsy may slowly rotate their head back and forth while reading a book instead of slowly scanning their eyes across the page.

== Cause ==
A lesion, which is an abnormality in tissue due to injury or disease, can disrupt the transmission of signals from the brain to the eye. Almost all conjugate gaze palsies originate from a lesion somewhere in the brain stem, usually the midbrain, or pons. These lesions can be caused by stroke, or conditions such as Koerber-Salus-Elschnig syndrome, progressive supranuclear palsy, olivopontocerebellar syndrome, Niemann-Pick Disease, Type C, or envenomation such as from a scorpion sting.

== Mechanism ==
The location of the lesion determines the type of palsy. Nonselective horizontal gaze palsies are caused by lesions in the abducens nucleus. This is where the cranial nerve VI leaves on its way to the lateral rectus muscle, which controls eye movement horizontally away from the midline of the body. The cranial nerve VI also has interneurons connecting to the medial rectus, which controls horizontal eye movement towards from the midline of the body. Since the lateral rectus controls movement away from the center of the body, a lesion in the abducens nucleus disrupts the pathways controlling outward movements, not allowing the right eye to move right and the left eye to move left. Nerve VI has the longest subarachnoid distance to its target tissue, making it susceptible to lesions. Lesions anywhere in the abducens nucleus, cranial nerve VI neurons, or interneurons can affect eye movement towards the side of the lesion. Lesions on both sides of the abducens nucleus can cause a total loss of horizontal eye movement.

One other type of gaze palsy is a horizontal saccadic palsy. Saccades are very quick intermittent eye movements. The paramedian pontine reticular formation(PPRF), also in the pons is responsible for saccadic movement, relaying signals to the abducens nucleus. Lesions in the PPRF cause what would be saccadic horizontal eye movements to be much slower or in the case of very severe lesions, nonexistent. Horizontal gaze palsies are known to be linked to Progressive scoliosis. This occurs because pathways controlling saccadic movements are disrupted by the lesion and only slow movements controlled by a different motor pathway are unaffected.

Lesions in the midbrain can interfere with efferent motor signals before they arrive at the pons. This can also cause slowed horizontal saccadic movements and failure for the eye to reach its target location during saccades. This damage normally happens in the oculomotor nucleus of the midbrain As in horizontal saccadic palsy, the saccades are stopped or slowed from the disrupted pathway, only in this case the signal is disrupted before it reaches the PPRF.

One-and-a-half syndrome is associated with damage to the paramedian pontine reticular formation and the medial longitudinal fasciculus. These combined damages cause both a complete gaze impairment on the ipsilateral side and a "half" gaze impairment on the contralateral side. As seen in horizontal saccadic palsy, the impairment of the contralateral side gaze is caused by the disrupted pathways coming from the PPRF, while the "half" impairment is from the signal passing through the medial longitudinal fascicles not being able to reach its target. One-and-a-half syndrome is normally associated with horizontal gaze.

Although more rare than horizontal, one-and-a-half syndrome from damage to the paramedian pontine reticular formation and the medial longitudinal fasciculus can be shown to affect vertical gaze. This can cause impairment of vertical gaze, allowing only one eye to move vertically.

== Diagnosis ==
A patient may be diagnosed with a conjugate gaze palsy by a physician performing a number of tests to examine the patient's eye movement abilities. In most cases, the gaze palsy can simply be seen by inability to move both eyes in one direction. However, sometimes a patient exhibits an abduction nystagmus in both eyes, indicating evidence of a conjugate gaze palsy. A nystagmus is a back and forth "jerk" of the eye when attempting to hold a gaze in one direction.

=== Classification ===
Conjugate gaze palsies can be classified into palsies affecting horizontal gaze and vertical gaze.

==== Horizontal gaze palsies ====
Horizontal gaze palsies affect gaze of both eyes either toward or away from the midline of the body. Horizontal gaze palsies are generally caused by a lesion in the brain stem and connecting nerves, normally in the pons.

==== Progressive scoliosis ====
Horizontal gaze palsy with progressive scoliosis (HGPPS) is a very rare form of conjugate gaze palsy, appearing only in a few dozen families worldwide. HGPPS prevents horizontal movement of both eyes, causing people with this condition to have to move their head to see moving objects. In addition to the eye movement impairment, HGPPS is coupled with progressive scoliosis, although eye symptoms usually appear before scoliosis. HGPPS is caused by a mutation in the ROBO3 gene, which is important in cross-over of motor and sensory signals, preventing horizontal eye movement. In addition to the mutation, lesions in the midbrain and pons are common. This can also include a complete absence of a formation in the pons, the facial colliculus, which is responsible for some facial movements. The cause of progressive scoliosis in HGPPS and why HGPPS does not affect vertical gaze is unclear. Progressive scoliosis is normally treated with surgery.

==== Vertical gaze palsies ====
Vertical gaze palsies affect movement of one or both eyes either in upward direction, up and down direction, or more rarely only downward direction. Very rarely only movement of one eye in one direction is affected. Vertical gaze palsies are often caused by lesions to the midbrain due to a stroke or a tumor. In the case that only downward gaze is affected, the cause is normally progressive supranuclear palsy.

== Treatment ==
There is no treatment of conjugate gaze palsy itself, so the disease or condition causing the gaze palsy must be treated, likely by surgery. As stated in the causes section, the gaze palsy may be due to a lesion caused by stroke or a condition. Some of the conditions such as Progressive supra nuclear palsy are not curable, and treatment only includes therapy to regain some tasks, not including gaze control. Other conditions such as Niemann-Pick disease type C have limited drug therapeutic options. Stroke victims with conjugate gaze palsies may be treated with intravenous therapy if the patent presents early enough, or with a surgical procedure for other cases.

== Prognosis ==
The prognosis of a lesion in the visual neural pathways that causes a conjugate gaze palsy varies greatly. Depending on the nature of the lesion, recovery may happen rapidly or recovery may never progress. For example, optic neuritis, which is caused by inflammation, may heal in just weeks, while patients with an ischemic optic neuropathy may never recover.
