= Palsy =

Palsy is a medical term which refers to various types of paralysis or paresis, often accompanied by weakness and the loss of feeling and uncontrolled body movements such as shaking. The word originates from the Anglo-Norman paralisie, parleisie et al., from the accusative form of Latin paralysis, from Ancient Greek παράλυσις (parálusis), from παραλύειν (paralúein, "to disable on one side"), from παρά (pará, "beside") + λύειν (lúein, "loosen"). The word is longstanding in the English language, having appeared in the play Grim the Collier of Croydon, reported to have been written as early as 1599:

Rob. I'll have thee come, I say. Why tremblest thou?
Grim. No sir, not I; 'tis a palsy I have still.

In some editions, the Bible passage of Luke 5:18 is translated to refer to "a man which was taken with a palsy". More modern editions simply refer to a man who is paralysed. Although the term has historically been associated with paralysis generally, it "is now almost always used in connection to the word cerebral—meaning the brain".

Specific kinds of palsy include:

- Bell's palsy, partial facial paralysis
- Bulbar palsy, impairment of cranial nerves
- Cerebral palsy, a neural disorder caused by intracranial lesions
- Conjugate gaze palsy, a disorder affecting the ability to move the eyes
- Erb's palsy, also known as brachial palsy, involving paralysis of an arm
- Spinal muscular atrophy, also known as wasting palsy
- Progressive supranuclear palsy, a degenerative disease
- Squatter's palsy, a common name for bilateral peroneal nerve palsy that may be triggered by sustained squatting
- Third nerve palsy, involving cranial nerve III
