= Intercalated nucleus =

Group of nerve cells found in the medulla oblongata

Identifiers
- NeuroNames: 759
- NeuroLex ID: birnlex_2654
- TA98: A14.1.04.264
- TA2: 6019
- FMA: 72597

Intercalated nucleus (nucleus intercalatus) called also Staderini nucleus is a group of nerve cells in the medulla oblongata, between the dorsal nucleus of the vagus nerve (lateral to the intercalated nucleus) and the nucleus of the hypoglossal nerve (medial to intercalated nucleus), forming part of the perihypoglossal nuclear complex.

== Function ==
Probably involved in the control of the vestibulo-ocular reflex and may contribute to the vertical neural integrator.

Described for the first time in 1894 by Rutilio Staderini (1861–1942), Italian neuroanatomist
