= Medial vestibulospinal tract =

Nerve tract of the spinal cord

- Vestibulospinal tract is 2c, in red at bottom center.

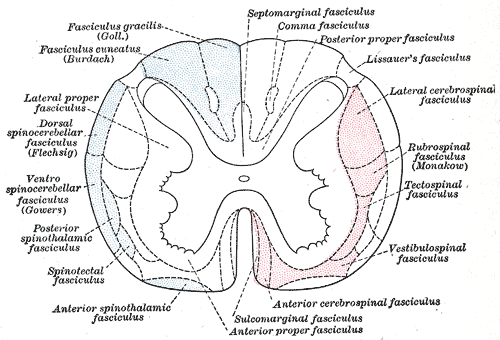
- Diagram of the principal fasciculi of the spinal cord.

Details

Identifiers
- Latin: tractus vestibulospinalis medialis
- TA98: A14.1.02.207
- TA2: 6114
- FMA: 75798

The medial vestibulospinal tract is one of the descending spinal tracts of the ventromedial funiculus of the spinal cord. It is found only in the cervical spine and above.

The medial part of the vestibulospinal tract is the smaller part, and is primarily made of fibers from the medial vestibular nucleus. It projects bilaterally down the spinal cord and triggers the ventral horn of the cervical spinal circuits, particularly controlling lower motor neurons associated with the spinal accessory nerve (CN XI). Additionally, the pathway projects superiorly to the paramedian pontine reticular formation, indirectly innervating the nuclei of CN VI and III. Through this superior projection, the medial vestibulospinal tract is involved in "yoking" the eyes together in response to rapid movement of the head. Thus, cumulatively, it controls head and whole-body orientation.
