= Musculus retractor bulbi =

Accessory extraocular muscle found in most mammals, excluding humans and primates

Retractor bulbi muscle
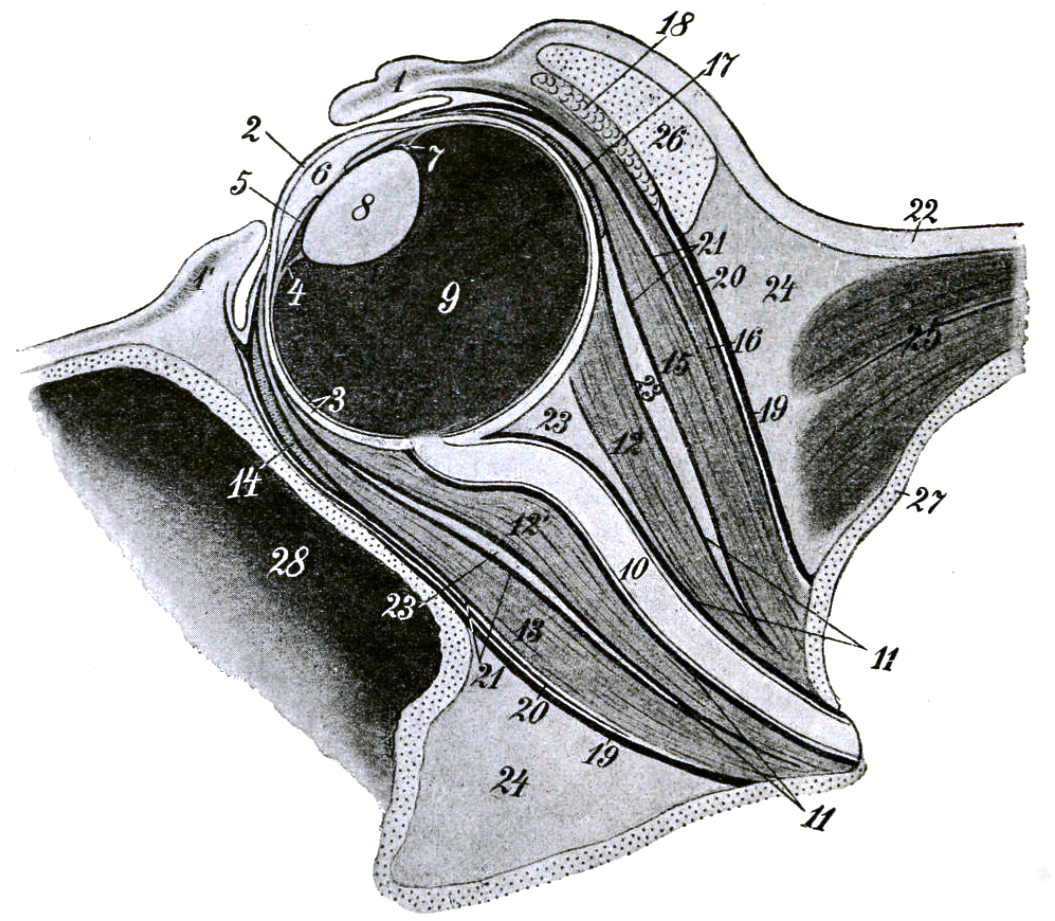
- Cross section of a horse's eye. Location of the retractor bulbi at 12, 12' (deep to the rectus muscles; absent in humans)

Details
- Pronunciation: /rɪˈtræktər ˈbʊlbaɪ/
- System: Muscular system
- Origin: Apex of the orbit around the optic canal and periorbita
- Insertion: Posterior sclera, just posterior to the equator of the globe
- Artery: Muscular branches of the external ophthalmic artery
- Vein: Ophthalmic veins
- Nerve: Abducens nerve (CN VI)
- Actions: Retracts eyeball; draws nictitating membrane across cornea

Identifiers
- Latin: Musculus retractor bulbi

The musculus retractor bulbi (Latin for "the muscle that retracts the eyeball") is an extraocular muscle found in the orbit of most mammals and some other vertebrates, but is notably absent in humans and other primates. Its primary function is to retract the eyeball deeper into the orbit, usually as part of an eye-protection reflex. This action also often aids in the movement of the nictitating membrane (third eyelid) across the cornea for additional protection.

The retractor bulbi muscle is a muscle posterior to the eyeball. It generally originates from the orbital apex near the optic canal, often attaching to the periorbita. The base encloses a core of fat and the optic nerve. It surrounds the optic nerve, and is surrounded by the 4 rectus bulbi muscles. From its origin, the muscle fibers travel rostrally (towards the eyeball), and may either be a cone of muscles, or divide into 4 or more distinct slips or bundles. These slips then insert onto the posterior aspect of the sclera, typically behind the insertion points of the rectus muscles.

When it is a cone-shaped muscle, it may be called "choanoid" (Latin for "funnel-like") or "musculus choanoides". It has also been called "musculus suspensorius oculi".

== Comparative anatomy ==
The retractor bulbi muscle first appears in amphibians and certain reptile species. It is present in most mammals, particularly domestic animals, and achieves its most advanced development in ruminant species. It generally does not exist in fishes, snakes, chameleons, birds, most primates, or humans.

The specific shape of the retractor bulbi varies significantly among different species.

- In equines, it often forms a continuous muscular cone with a single medial opening for the optic nerve and inserts near the equator of the eyeball.
- In bovines, it forms a complete cone, with 3 main slips (medial, dorsolateral, ventrolateral) inserting into the equator, and a 4th deeper slip inserting dorsally to the optic nerve near the posterior pole.
- In sheep, 4 distinct bundles inserting at the equator, with some fibers potentially inserting near the optic nerve.
- In pigs, 4 bundles only slightly separated, inserting near the equator.
- In dogs, 4 distinct bundles inserting ~5 mm posterior to the recti muscle insertions; in some individuals, these can fuse into a complete cone.
- In cats, poorly developed, 4 distinct strips, inserting posterior to the equator.
- In rabbits, an almost complete but short and relatively weak cone, inserting far posterior to the equator.
- In cetaceans, it is well-developed and "robust". It is reported as a fused cone in Physeter macrocephalus and Kogia breviceps, of 4 distinct strips in the Stenella frontalis, of 4 indistinct strips with specimen-varying degrees of fusion in Balaenoptera acutorostrata, etc.
- In Sphenodon, it has 2 bulbs, and is the largest of the extra-ocular muscles, and is innervated not only by a branch of the 6th cranial (abducens) nerve but also by a sprig from the ciliary ganglion.

Two main morphological fiber types, analogous to Type I and Type II skeletal muscle fibers, have been observed in the retractor bulbi of rodents.

=== In humans ===
The muscle does not exist in humans or other simians, however there are remnants. In humans, there is the fascia bulbi. In the macaque, there is a remnant muscle lying above the lateral rectus, and vestigial muscular fibers at this region have been reported in humans. Furthermore, in humans there is always a well-marked connective tissue strand in this position, running from the back of the fascia bulbi to the apex of the orbit.

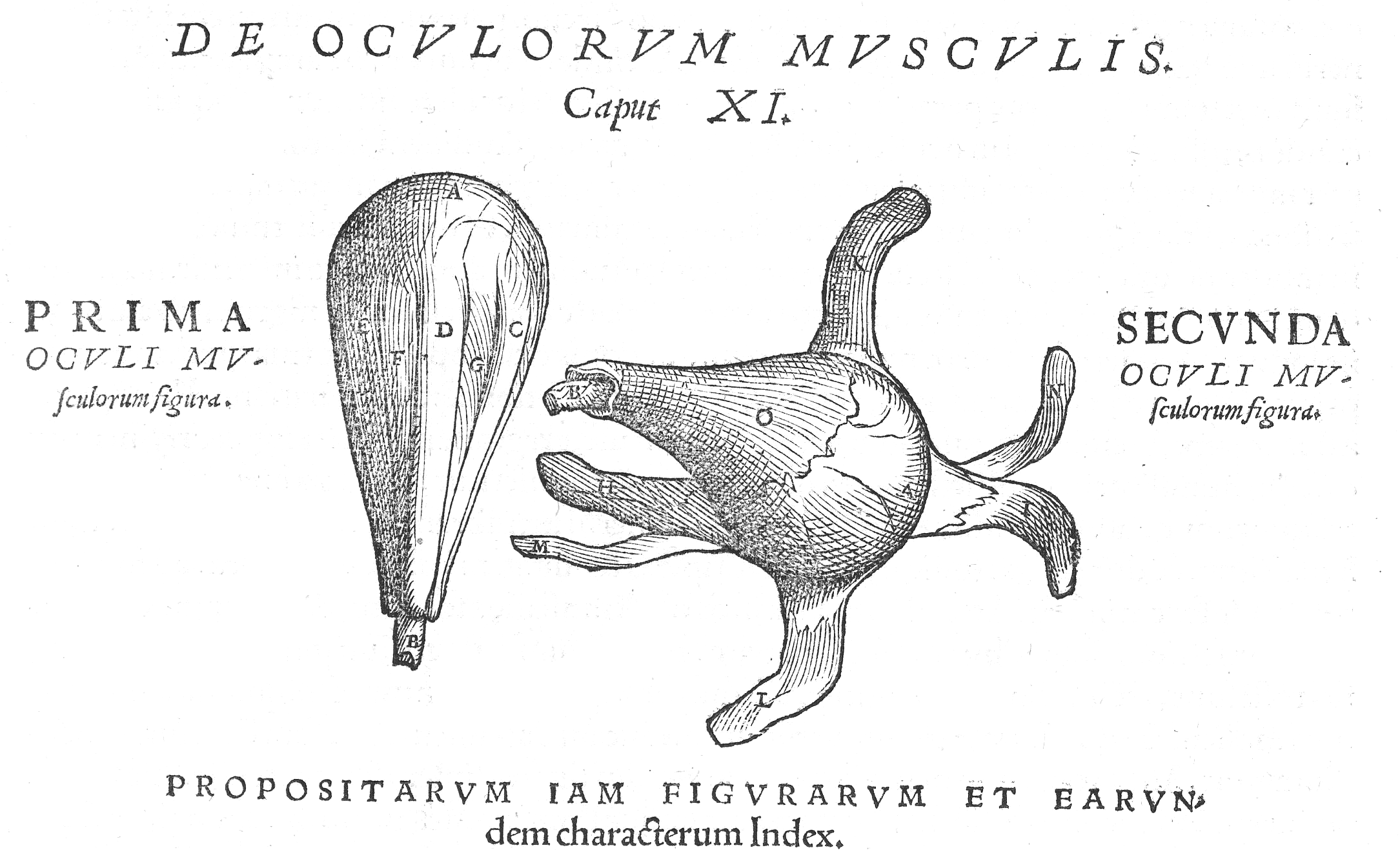
De Humani Corporis Fabrica Libri Septem, page 239, illustrating the nonexistent retractor.

Galen stated that there were 7 external eye muscles inserted around the optic nerve. The 6 muscles are the familiar extraocular muscles. He postulated that a 7th muscle exists, and explained accommodation by retraction of the (non‐existent) retractor muscle. He also postulated that the retractor muscle keeps the optic nerve from stretching to the breaking point during head trauma. This he mentioned in De usu partium, 10.8, and in de Anatomicis administrationibus, X.I.37. His mistake was copied repeatedly, including De Humani Corporis Fabrica Libri Septem (1543).

== Function ==
The primary action of the retractor bulbi muscle is to passively prevent the eye from protruding, and actively retract the eyeball into the orbit. This is a protective reflex, often initiated by noxious stimuli to the cornea or face, or by strong light. The retraction of the globe helps to shield the eye from potential injury.

In many animals possessing a nictitating membrane, the contraction of the retractor bulbi muscle also facilitates the passive or active movement of this third eyelid across the surface of the eye, offering further protection and aiding in corneal lubrication.

In the great white shark, the eyeballs retract extremely when attacking.

== Anatomy ==
It is innervated primarily by the abducens nerve (cranial nerve VI). However, contributions from the oculomotor nerve (cranial nerve III) have also been described in various species, including dogs and cats. In certain cetaceans, it is exclusively innervated by nerves from VI, even though some of these nerves would, before arriving at the muscle, branch out and merge into III. This creates an illusion of innervation by III.

The retractor bulbi muscle is possibly derived from the lateral rectus muscle. It is supplied by the muscular branches of the ophthalmic artery, and drained by the ophthalmic plexus.

As reported in lambs, proprioceptive fibers from muscle spindles within the retractor bulbi muscle travel via the ophthalmic branch of the trigeminal nerve (cranial nerve V), with their cell bodies located in the trigeminal ganglion.

== Clinical significance ==
While the retractor bulbi muscle is absent in humans, understanding its anatomy and function in animals is important in veterinary ophthalmology and comparative anatomy.

Paralysis or dysfunction of the abducens nerve can lead to an inability to retract the globe and, consequently, may affect the movement of the nictitating membrane. In Horner's syndrome in animals, enophthalmos (sinking of the eyeball) can occur if the circular periorbital smooth muscles are no longer signaled by the sympathetic system. This leads to a loss of muscle tone in the muscles. The retractor bulbi, without its antagonist, draws the eyeball inwards.

It has been rarely reported to occur in humans. Remnants of this muscle are found in some monkeys, for example, the Rhesus macaque. In the macaque, it is a single bundle of width ~ 1 mm, between the superior and lateral recti muscles, nearer to the latter.

Anomalies in the orbital muscles of humans are frequently considered to be evolutionary remnants of the retractor bulbi muscle. In a specific documented case, a remnant of the retractor muscle found in a human orbit received nerve supply from both the abducent nerve and the oculomotor nerves.

The retractor bulbi muscle is considered an ancestral feature in vertebrates. It is present in many groups, including amphibians, reptiles, birds, and most mammals. Its absence in primates, including humans, represents a derived condition. It has been suggested that fibromuscular tissue bands occasionally found in human orbits could be atavistic remnants of the retractor bulbi muscle.

== See also ==
- Extraocular muscles
- Abducens nerve
- Oculomotor nerve
- Nictitating membrane
- Orbit (anatomy)
