= Paramedian pontine reticular formation =

Subset of neurons in certain nuclei

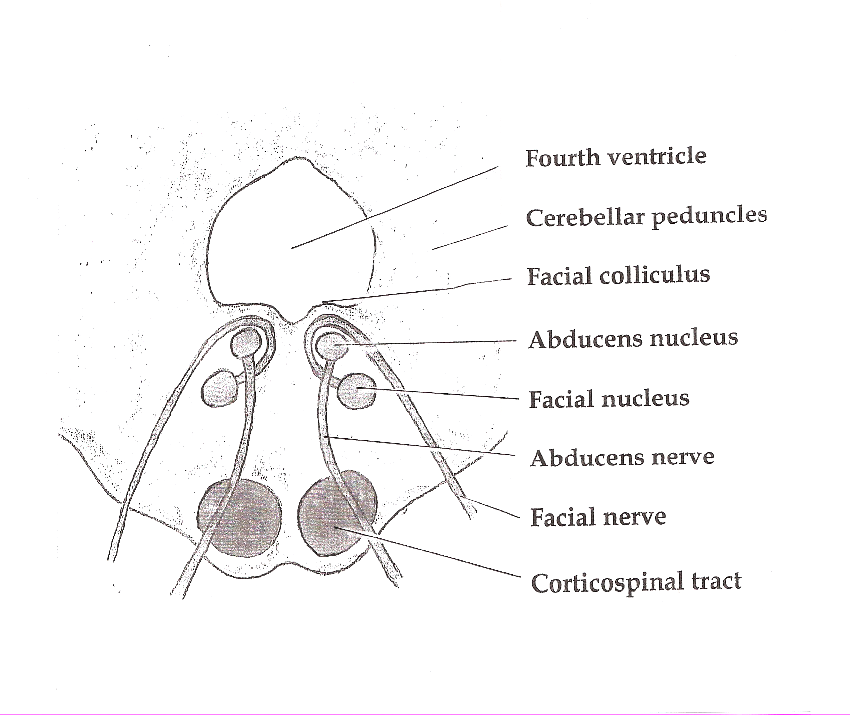
- Axial section of the pons at the level of the facial colliculus (PPRF not labeled, but region is visible, near abducens nucleus)

Details
- Part of: Brain stem
- Artery: Pontine arteries
- Vein: Transverse and lateral pontine veins

Identifiers
- Latin: formatio reticularis pontis paramediana
- NeuroNames: 1399

The paramedian pontine reticular formation (PPRF) is a subset of neurons of the oral and caudal pontine reticular nuclei. With the abducens nucleus it makes up the horizontal gaze centre. It is situated in the pons adjacent to the abducens nucleus. It projects to the ipsilateral abducens (cranial nerve VI) nucleus, and contralateral oculomotor (cranial nerve III) nucleus (Note: These two cranial nerve nuclei in turn control the ipsilateral lateral rectus muscle, and contralateral medial rectus muscle, respectively - their silmuntaneous contraction will thus cause both eyes to move ipsilaterally (i.e. towards the side of the PPRF in question).) to mediate conjugate horizontal gaze and saccades.

== Anatomy ==
The PPRF is situated in the pons just ventralmedial to the abducens nucleus. It is located anterior and lateral to the medial longitudinal fasciculus. It is continuous caudally with the nucleus prepositus hypoglossi.

The PPRF (and adjacent regions of the pons) are traversed by fibers projecting to the abducens nucleus that mediate smooth pursuit, vestibular reflexes, and gaze holding.

=== Afferents ===
The PPRF receives afferents from:

- contralateral frontal eye field of the middle frontal gyrus of the frontal lobe (via frontopontine fibers The frontal eye field meanwhile receives afferents from the visual cortex.
- superior colliculus
- vestibular nuclei
- other parts of the reticular formation.

=== Efferents ===
The PPRF mediates horizontal conjugate gaze (i.e. simultaneous horizontal movement of both eyes) by projecting to both:

- the ipsilateral abducens (CN VI) nucleus (which controls the ipsilateral lateral rectus muscle),
- (through the medial longitudinal fasciculus) the contralateral oculomotor (CN III) nucleus (specifically the population of its neurons that innervate the contralateral medial rectus muscle).

The pararaphal nucleus - one of distinct neuron population in the PPRF - projects to the flocculus of the cerebellum.

== Function ==
The PPRF mediates horizontal conjugate eye movements. It is important in mediating saccadic eye movements. It is probably not involved in smooth pursuit.

The PPRF generates excitatory bursts that are delivered to the ipsilateral abduecens nucleus to drive ipsilateral saccades (inhibitory saccadic stimuli are meanwhile delivered to the abducens nucleus from the contralateral medulla oblongata).

== Pathophysiology ==
Destructive lesions of the PPRF cause ipsilateral horizontal conjugate gaze palsy and mostly impair ipsilateral horizontal saccades, however, other horizontal and vertical eye movements may also be affected as the PPRF contains multiple distinct populations of neurons important in saccade generation, as well as being traversed by nerve fibers involved in eye movements that elsewhere; dysfunction of horizontal saccades will additionally also indirectly disrupt (slow and misdirect) vertical saccades (though slowing of all saccades may also be accounted for by destruction of adjacent omnipause neurons of the interposited raphe nucleus).

In the short-term, unilateral lesions of the PPRF may be characterised clinically by contralateral deviation of the eyes; looking contralaterally induces nystagmus characterised by quick twitches directed contralaterally whereas ipsilateral twitches are slow and do not move beyond the midline. More extensive lesions will also affect inhibition of antagonists, abolishing ipsilateral saccades.

== Clinical significance ==
Lesions of the medial pontine regions are relatively common. Due to the small size of the arteries in the area, the most common cause of a local lesion is an infarction due to lipohyalinosis and hypertension. Like other small arteries of the brain, these vessels are vulnerable to microemboli, especially those generated due to turbulence or low-flow states in those with artificial heart valves or arrhythmias, respectively. Unilateral lesions of the PPRF produce characteristic findings:

- Loss of horizontal saccades directed towards the side of the lesion, no matter the current position of gaze
- Contralateral gaze deviation (acute lesions, such as early stroke, only)
- Gaze-evoked lateral nystagmus on looking away from the side of the lesion
- Bilateral lesions produce horizontal gaze palsy and slowing of vertical saccades

== See also ==
- Rostral interstitial nucleus of medial longitudinal fasciculus - vertical gaze center.
- Internuclear ophthalmoplegia
- One and a half syndrome
- Ophthalmoparesis
- Opsoclonus
- Saccade
