= Vestibulo-ocular reflex =

Reflex where rotation of the head causes eye movement to stabilize vision

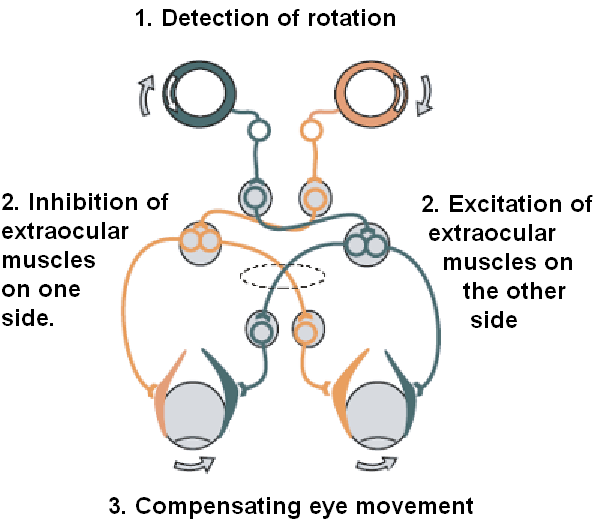
The vestibulo-ocular reflex. A rotation of the head is detected, which triggers an inhibitory signal to the extraocular muscles on one side and an excitatory signal to the muscles on the other side. The result is a compensatory movement of the eyes.

The vestibulo-ocular reflex (VOR) is a reflex that acts to stabilize gaze during head movement, with eye movement due to activation of the vestibular system, it is also known as the cervico-ocular reflex. The reflex acts to stabilize images on the retinas of the eye during head movement. Gaze is held steadily on a location by producing eye movements in the direction opposite that of head movement. For example, when the head moves to the right, the eyes move to the left, meaning the image a person sees stays the same even though the head has turned. Since slight head movement is present all the time, VOR is necessary for stabilizing vision: people with an impaired reflex find it difficult to read using print, because the eyes do not stabilise during small head tremors, and also because damage to reflex can cause nystagmus.

The VOR does not depend on what is seen. It can also be activated by hot or cold stimulation of the inner ear, where the vestibular system sits, and works even in total darkness or when the eyes are closed. However, in the presence of light, the fixation reflex is also added to the movement. Most features of VOR are present in kittens raised in complete darkness.

In lower animals, the organs that coordinate balance and movement are not independent from eye movement. A fish, for instance, moves its eyes by reflex when its tail is moved. Humans have semicircular canals, neck muscle "stretch" receptors, and the utricle (gravity organ). Though the semicircular canals cause most of the reflexes which are responsive to acceleration, the maintaining of balance is mediated by the stretch of neck muscles and the pull of gravity on the utricle (otolith organ) of the inner ear.

The VOR has both rotational and translational aspects. When the head rotates about any axis (horizontal, vertical, or torsional) distant visual images are stabilized by rotating the eyes about the same axis, but in the opposite direction. When the head translates, for example during walking, the visual fixation point is maintained by rotating gaze direction in the opposite direction, by an amount that depends on distance.

== Function ==

The vestibulo-ocular reflex is driven by signals arising from the vestibular system of the inner ear. The semicircular canals detect head rotation and provide the rotational component, whereas the otoliths detect head translation and drive the translational component. The signal for the horizontal rotational component travels via the vestibular nerve through the vestibular ganglion and end in the vestibular nuclei in the brainstem. From these nuclei, fibers cross to the abducens nucleus of the opposite side of the brain. Here, fibres synapse with two additional pathways. One pathway projects directly to the lateral rectus muscle of the eye via the abducens nerve. Another nerve tract projects from the abducens nucleus by the medial longitudinal fasciculus to the oculomotor nucleus of the opposite side, which contains motor neurons that drive eye muscle activity, specifically activating the medial rectus muscle of the eye through the oculomotor nerve.

Another pathway (not in picture) directly projects from the vestibular nucleus through the ascending tract of Deiter's to the medial rectus muscle motor neuron of the same side. In addition there are inhibitory vestibular pathways to the ipsilateral abducens nucleus. However no direct vestibular neuron to medial rectus motoneuron pathway exists.

Similar pathways exist for the vertical and torsional components of the VOR.

=== Oculomotor integrator ===
In addition to these direct pathways, which drive the velocity of eye rotation, there is an indirect pathway that builds up the position signal needed to prevent the eye from rolling back to center when the head stops moving. This pathway is particularly important when the head is moving slowly because here position signals dominate over velocity signals. David A. Robinson discovered that the eye muscles require this dual velocity-position drive, and also proposed that it must arise in the brain by mathematically integrating the velocity signal and then sending the resulting position signal to the motoneurons. Robinson was correct: the 'neural integrator' for horizontal eye position was found in the nucleus prepositus hypoglossi in the medulla, and the neural integrator for vertical and torsional eye positions was found in the interstitial nucleus of Cajal in the midbrain. The same neural integrators also generate eye position for other conjugate eye movements such as saccades and smooth pursuit.

The integrator is leaky, with a characteristic leaking time of 20 s. For example, when the subject is sitting still and focusing on an object, and suddenly the light is turned off, the eyes would return to their neutral position in around 40 seconds even as the subject is attempting to keep the focus.

=== Example ===
For instance, if the head is turned clockwise as seen from above, then excitatory impulses are sent from the semicircular canal on the right side via the vestibular nerve through Scarpa's ganglion and end in the right vestibular nuclei in the brainstem. From this nuclei excitatory fibres cross to the left abducens nucleus. There they project and stimulate the lateral rectus of the left eye via the abducens nerve. In addition, by the medial longitudinal fasciculus and oculomotor nuclei, they activate the medial rectus muscles on the right eye. As a result, both eyes will turn counter-clockwise.

Furthermore, some neurons from the right vestibular nucleus directly stimulate the right medial rectus motor neurons, and inhibits the right abducens nucleus.

=== Integrated neural control ===
The VOR is controlled by a neural integrator. The neuron from each horizontal semicircular canal fires at a rate of $(90 + 0.4 \dot H) \; \mathrm{Hz}$, where $\dot H$ is the sensed horizontal angular velocity of the semicircular canal. The motoneuron commanding the horizontal eye muscles fires at a rate of $(4 \;\mathrm{Hz / deg}) \theta + (1.0 \;\mathrm{Hz / (deg/sec)}) \dot \theta$, where $\theta$ is the horizontal turning angle, and $\dot \theta$ is its horizontal angular speed. The two terms account for the elasticity and viscosity of ocular tissue.

The rotational moment of inertia of the eye is negligible, as individuals wearing weighted contact lens that increases the rotational moment of inertia almost 100-fold still has the same VOR (p. 94).

=== Speed ===
The vestibulo-ocular reflex needs to be fast: for clear vision, head movement must be compensated almost immediately; otherwise, vision corresponds to a photograph taken with a shaky hand. Signals are sent from the semicircular canals using only three neurons, called the three neuron arc. This results in eye movements that lag head movement by less than 10 ms. The vestibulo-ocular reflex is one of the fastest reflexes in the human body.

=== VOR suppression ===
When a person tracks the movement of something with both their eyes and head together, the VOR is counterproductive to the goal of keeping the gaze and head angle aligned. Research indicates that there exists mechanisms in the brain to suppress the VOR using the active visual (retinal) feedback obtained by watching the object in motion. In the absence of visual feedback, such as when the object passes behind an opaque barrier, humans can continue to visually track the apparent position of the object using anticipatory (extra-retinal) systems within the brain, and the VOR is also suppressed during this activity. The VOR can even be cognitively suppressed, such as when following an imagined target with the eyes and head together, although the effect tends to be less dramatic than with visual feedback.

=== Gain ===
The "gain" of the VOR is defined as the change in the eye angle divided by the change in the head angle during the head turn. Ideally the gain of the rotational VOR is 1.0. The gain of the horizontal and vertical VOR is usually close to 1.0, but the gain of the torsional VOR (rotation around the line of sight) is generally low. The gain of the translational VOR has to be adjusted for distance, because of the geometry of motion parallax. When the head translates, the angular direction of near targets changes faster than the angular direction of far targets.

If the gain of the VOR is wrong (different from 1)—for example, if eye muscles are weak, or if a person puts on a new pair of eyeglasses—then head movement results in image motion on the retina, resulting in blurred vision. Under such conditions, motor learning adjusts the gain of the VOR to produce more accurate eye motion. This is what is referred to as VOR adaptation.

Nearsighted people who habitually wear negative spectacles have lower VOR gain. Farsighted people or aphakes who habitually wear positive spectacle have higher VOR gain. People who habitually wear contact lens show no change in VOR gain. Monocular, disconjugate adaptation of the VOR is possible, for example, after extraocular muscle palsy. (p. 27)

The phase of the VOR can also adapt.

=== Leak ===
The oculomotor integrator is a leaky integrator, with a characteristic leaking time of ~20 s. If the leaking time is too low, some form of adaptation occurs to "patch the leak" to raise the leaking time. It is hypothesized that the leaking integrator is constructed by a feedback circuit with a gain of slightly below 1, and adaptation occurs by adjusting the gain of the feedback circuit. The hypothesis is tested by using a specially patterned optokinetic drum that simulates the visual effect of having a very leaky oculomotor integrator. After 1 hour of viewing, the integrator becomes "anti-leaky", meaning that its value grows exponentially even in the absence of input. The eye motion becomes positive-feedback, meaning that if it is slightly to the left of a fixation target, it would drift even further to the left, and similarly for the right. It is also accompanied by nausea. (p. 84)

=== Disruption by ethanol ===
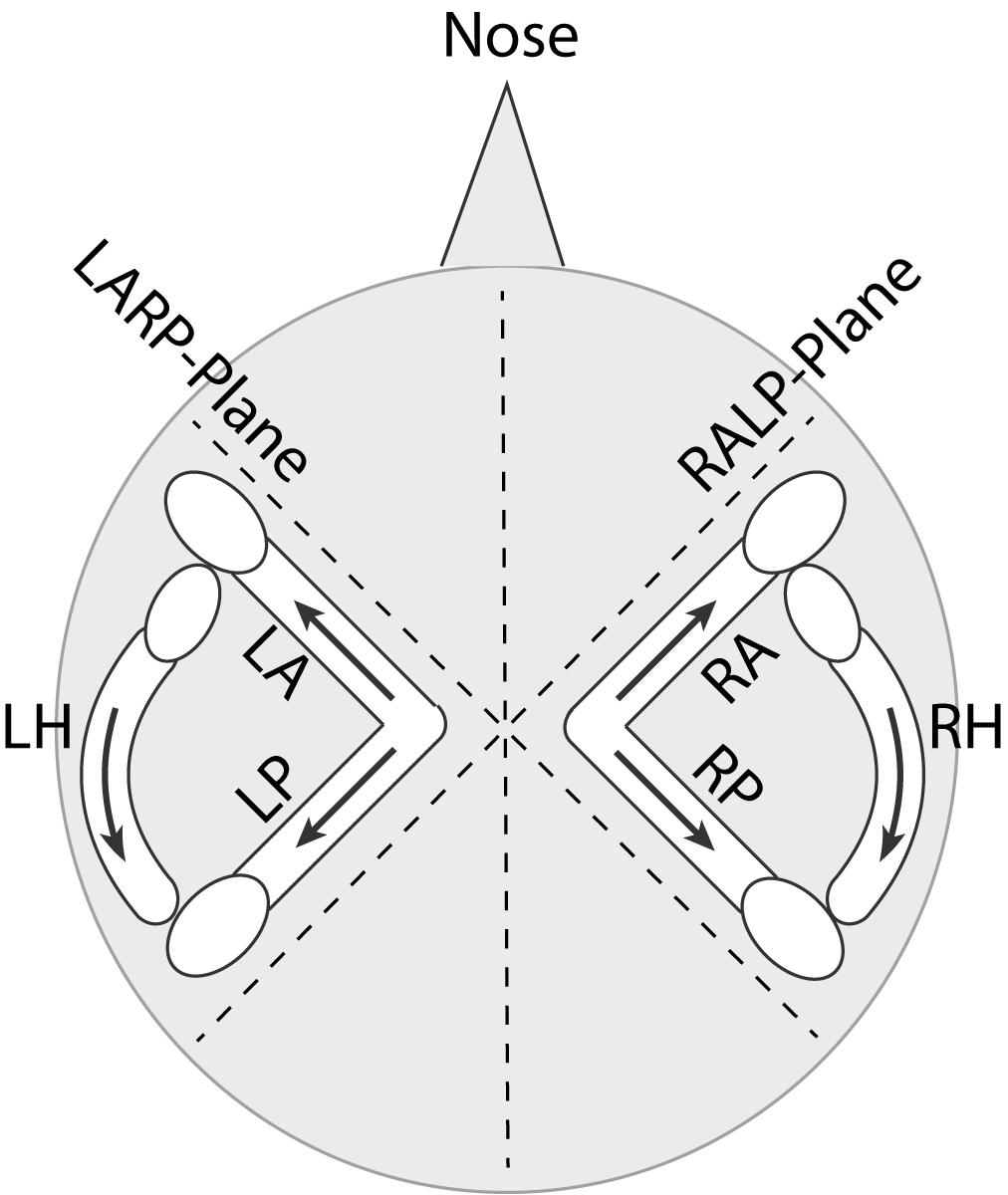
Orientation of three semicircular canals in the head

Ethanol consumption can disrupt the VOR, reducing dynamic visual acuity. In normal conditions, the cupula and the endolymph are equal in density (both are approximately that of water). After ingesting ethanol, the ethanol diffuses into the cupula before it diffuses into the endolymph, because it is closer to blood capillaries. This makes the cupula temporarily lighter. In this state, if a person lies down with right cheek touching the ground, then the cupula in the left ear would float towards the left, creating an illusory sense of slow left-to-right head rotation. To compensate for this, the VOR moves the eyes right-to-left slowly, until it reaches the limit, and the eyes then pull to the right rapidly (nystagmus). This is the positional alcohol nystagmus, phase I (PAN I). The unusual vestibular stimulation also caused motion sickness symptoms: illusions of bodily rotations, dizziness, and nausea. These symptoms subside in a few seconds after assuming an upright posture.

After some time, the density of cupula and endolymph equalizes, removing the nystagmus effect. After ethanol is fully metabolized, the cupula returns to normal density first, creating nystagmus in the opposite direction (PAN II) during the hangover.

As predicted, heavy water (1.1 density of water) consumption has the exact opposite nystagmus effect compared to ethanol consumption. Consuming a mixture of heavy water ($4 \;\mathrm{ml/kg}$) and ethanol ($2 \;\mathrm{ml/kg}$) largely cancels out the effect. Macroglobulinaemia, or consuming glycerol (1.26 density of water), have similar effects as heavy water.

== Clinical significance ==
=== Testing ===
This reflex can be tested by the rapid head impulse test or Halmagyi–Curthoys test, in which the head is rapidly moved to the side with force, and is controlled if the eyes succeed to remain to look in the same direction. When the function of the right balance system is reduced, by a disease or by an accident, a quick head movement to the right cannot be sensed properly anymore. As a consequence, no compensatory eye movement is generated, and the patient cannot fixate a point in space during this rapid head movement.

The head impulse test can be done at the bed side and used as a screening tool for problems with a person's vestibular system. It can also be diagnostically tested by doing a video-head impulse test (VHIT). In this diagnostic test, a person wears highly sensitive goggles that detect rapid changes in eye movement. This test can provide site-specific information on vestibular system and its function.

Another way of testing the VOR response is a caloric reflex test, which is an attempt to induce nystagmus (compensatory eye movement in the absence of head motion) by pouring cold or warm water into the ear. Also available is bi-thermal air caloric irrigations, in which warm and cool air is administered into the ear.

The vestibulo-ocular reflex can be tested by the aforementioned caloric reflex test; this plays an important part in confirming diagnosis of brainstem death. A code of practice must be followed in this process, namely that of the Academy of Medical Royal Colleges.

== Related terms ==
=== Cervico-ocular reflex ===
Summary: Cervico-ocular reflex, also known by its acronym COR, involves the achievement of stabilization of a visual target, and image on the retina, through adjustments of gaze impacted by neck and, or head movements or rotations. The process works in conjunction with the vestibulo-ocular reflex (VOR). It is conspicuous in certain animals that cannot move their eyes much, such as owls.

== See also ==
- Cerebellum – Structure at the rear of the vertebrate brain, beneath the cerebrum
- Eyeblink conditioning – Technique in neuroscience/experimental psychology
- Nystagmus – Dysfunction of eye movement
- Pursuit movement – Type of eye movement used for closely following a moving object
- Saccade – Eye movement
- Vestibulocerebellar syndrome
