= Medial vestibular nucleus =

Neuron cluster of the medulla

- A cross section of the lower pons showing the medial vestibular nucleus (#3) labeled at the top left.

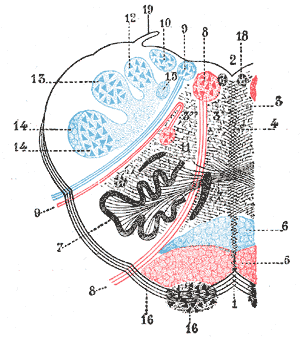
- Medial vestibular nucleus is not labeled, but region is visible near #10

Details

Identifiers
- Latin: nucleus vestibularis medialis
- NeuroNames: 717
- NeuroLex ID: nlx_144003
- TA98: A14.1.04.245; A14.1.05.426
- TA2: 6004
- FMA: 54611

The medial vestibular nucleus (Schwalbe nucleus) is one of the vestibular nuclei. It is located in the medulla oblongata.

Lateral vestibulo-spinal tract (lateral vestibular nucleus “Deiters”)- via ventrolateral medulla and spinal cord to ventral funiculus (lumbo-sacral segments). ..Ipsilaterally for posture

Medial vestibulo-spinal tract (medial, lateral, inferior, vestibular nuclei), bilateral projection via descending medial longitudinal fasciculus to cervical segments. DESCENDING MLF..Bilaterally for head/neck/eye movements

It is one of the nuclei that corresponds to CN VIII, corresponding to the vestibular nerve, which joins with the cochlear nerve.

It receives its blood supply from the Posterior Inferior Cerebellar Artery, which is compromised in the lateral medullary syndrome.

== See also ==
- Vestibular nerve
- Vestibular system
