= Gaze (physiology) =

Coordinated motion of the eyes and neck in physiology

The term gaze is frequently used in physiology to describe coordinated motion of the eyes and neck. The lateral gaze is controlled by the paramedian pontine reticular formation (PPRF). The vertical gaze is controlled by the rostral interstitial nucleus of medial longitudinal fasciculus and the interstitial nucleus of Cajal.

== Nerves and muscles ==
The three nerves that control the extraocular muscles are the oculomotor, trochlear, and abducens nerves, which are the third, fourth, and sixth cranial nerves. the abducens nerve is responsible for abducting the eye, which it controls through contraction of the lateral rectus muscle. The trochlear nerve controls the superior oblique muscle to rotate the eye along its axis in the orbit medially, which is called intorsion, and is a component of focusing the eyes on an object close to the face. The oculomotor nerve controls all the other extraocular muscles, as well as a muscle of the upper eyelid.

== Conjugate gaze ==
The conjugate gaze is the motion of both eyes in the same direction at the same time, and conjugate gaze palsy refers to an impairment of this function. The conjugate gaze is controlled by four different mechanisms:

- the saccadic system that allows for voluntary direction of the gaze
- the pursuit system that allows the subject to follow a moving object
- nystagmus which includes both vestibular nystagmus and optokinetic nystagmus. The vestibular system restores gaze in compensation for the rotation of the head whereas the optokinetic system restores gaze despite movements of the outside world.
- the vestibulo-ocular reflex system (VOR system) that corrects for the movements of the head to preserve the stable visual image of the world

== See also ==
- Paramedian pontine reticular formation
- Conjugate eye movement
