= Trochlear nerve =

Cranial nerve IV, for eye movements

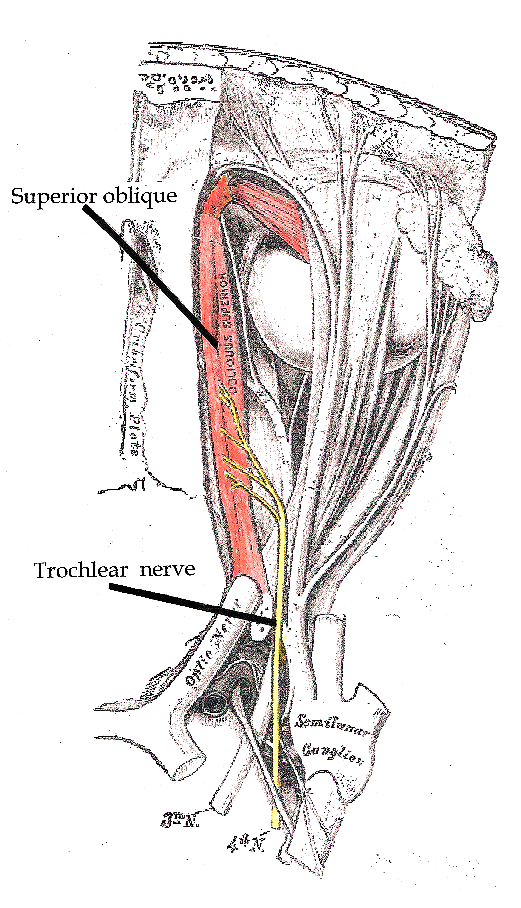
- The trochlear nerve entering the orbit, seen from above, supplies the superior oblique muscle

- The trochlear nerve (CN IV) seen with other cranial nerves. It is the only cranial nerve to emerge from behind the brainstem, and curves around it to reach the front

Details
- Innervates: Superior oblique muscle

Identifiers
- Latin: nervus trochlearis
- MeSH: D014321
- NeuroNames: 466
- TA98: A14.2.01.011
- TA2: 6191
- FMA: 50865

The trochlear nerve (/ˈtrɒklɪər/), (lit. pulley-like nerve) also known as the fourth cranial nerve, cranial nerve IV, or CN IV, is a cranial nerve that innervates a single muscle - the superior oblique muscle of the eye (which operates through the pulley-like trochlea). Unlike most other cranial nerves, the trochlear nerve is exclusively a motor nerve (somatic efferent nerve).

The trochlear nerve is unique among the cranial nerves in several respects:

- It is the smallest nerve in terms of the number of axons it contains.
- It has the greatest intracranial length.
- It is the only cranial nerve that exits from the dorsal (rear) aspect of the brainstem.
- It innervates a muscle, the superior oblique muscle, on the opposite side (contralateral) from its nucleus. The trochlear nerve decussates within the brainstem before emerging on the contralateral side of the brainstem (at the level of the inferior colliculus). An injury to the trochlear nucleus in the brainstem will result in an contralateral superior oblique muscle palsy, whereas an injury to the trochlear nerve (after it has emerged from the brainstem) results in an ipsilateral superior oblique muscle palsy.

The superior oblique muscle which the trochlear nerve innervates ends in a tendon that passes through a fibrous loop, the trochlea, located anteriorly on the medial aspect of the orbit. Trochlea means "pulley" in Latin; the fourth nerve is thus also named after this structure. The words trochlea and trochlear (/ˈtrɒkliə/, /ˈtrɒkliər/) come from Ancient Greek τροχιλέα trokhiléa, "pulley; block-and-tackle equipment".

== Structure ==
The trochlear nerve provides motor innervation to the superior oblique muscle of the eye, a skeletal muscle; the trochlear nerve thus carries axons of general somatic efferent type.

=== Course ===
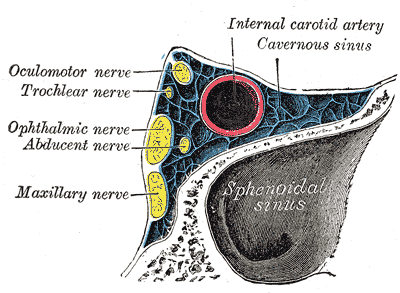
The Cavernous Sinus

Each trochlear nerve originates from a trochlear nucleus in the medial midbrain. From their respective nuclei, the two trochlear nerves then travel dorsal-ward through the substance of the midbrain surrounded by the periaqueductal gray, crossing over (decussating) within the midbrain before emerging from the dorsal midbrain just inferior to the inferior colliculus. Each trochlear nerve thus comes to course on the contralateral side, first passing laterally (to the side) and then anteriorly around the pons, then running forward toward the eye in the subarachnoid space. It passes between the posterior cerebral artery and the superior cerebellar artery. It then pierces the dura just under free margin of the tentorium cerebelli, close to the crossing of the attached margin of the tentorium and within millimeters of the posterior clinoid process. It runs on the outer wall of the cavernous sinus. Finally, it enters the orbit through the superior orbital fissure and to innervate the superior oblique muscle.

=== Development ===
The human trochlear nerve is derived from the basal plate of the embryonic midbrain.

== Clinical significance ==
=== Vertical diplopia ===
Injury to the trochlear nerve cause weakness of downward eye movement with consequent vertical diplopia (double vision). The affected eye drifts upward relative to the normal eye, due to the unopposed actions of the remaining extraocular muscles. The patient sees two visual fields (one from each eye), separated vertically. To compensate for this, patients learn to tilt the head forward (tuck the chin in) in order to bring the fields back together—to fuse the two images into a single visual field. This accounts for the "dejected" appearance of patients with "pathetic nerve" palsies.

=== Torsional diplopia ===
Trochlear nerve palsy also affects torsion (rotation of the eyeball in the plane of the face). Torsion is a normal response to tilting the head sideways. The eyes automatically rotate in an equal and opposite direction, so that the orientation of the environment remains unchanged—vertical things remain vertical.

Weakness of intorsion results in torsional diplopia, in which two different visual fields, tilted with respect to each other, are seen at the same time. To compensate for this, patients with trochlear nerve palsies tilt their heads to the opposite side, in order to fuse the two images into a single visual field.

The characteristic appearance of patients with fourth nerve palsies (head tilted to one side, chin tucked in) suggests the diagnosis, but other causes must be ruled out. For example, torticollis can produce a similar appearance.

=== Causes ===
The clinical syndromes can originate from both peripheral and central lesions.

==== Peripheral lesion ====
A peripheral lesion is damage to the bundle of nerves, in contrast to a central lesion, which is damage to the trochlear nucleus. Acute symptoms are probably a result of trauma or disease, while chronic symptoms probably are congenital.

===== Acute palsy =====
The most common cause of acute fourth nerve palsy is head trauma. Even relatively minor trauma can transiently stretch the fourth nerve (by transiently displacing the brainstem relative to the posterior clinoid process). Patients with minor damage to the fourth nerve will complain of "blurry" vision. Patients with more extensive damage will notice frank diplopia and rotational (torsional) disturbances of the visual fields. The usual clinical course is complete recovery within weeks to months.

Isolated injury to the fourth nerve can be caused by any process that stretches or compresses the nerve. A generalized increase in intracranial pressure—hydrocephalus, pseudotumor cerebri, hemorrhage, edema—will affect the fourth nerve, but the abducens nerve (VI) is usually affected first (producing horizontal diplopia, not vertical diplopia). Infections (meningitis, herpes zoster), demyelination (multiple sclerosis), diabetic neuropathy and cavernous sinus disease can affect the fourth nerve, as can orbital tumors and Tolosa–Hunt syndrome. In general, these diseases affect other cranial nerves as well. Isolated damage to the fourth nerve is uncommon in these settings.

===== Chronic palsy =====
The most common cause of chronic fourth nerve palsy is a congenital defect, in which the development of the fourth nerve (or its nucleus) is abnormal or incomplete. Congenital defects may be noticed in childhood, but minor defects may not become evident until adult life, when compensatory mechanisms begin to fail. Congenital fourth nerve palsies are amenable to surgical treatment.

==== Central lesion ====
Central damage is damage to the trochlear nucleus. It affects the contralateral eye. The nuclei of other cranial nerves generally affect ipsilateral structures (for example, the optic nerves - cranial nerves II - innervate both eyes).

The trochlear nucleus and its axons within the brainstem can be damaged by infarctions, hemorrhage, arteriovenous malformations, tumors and demyelination. Collateral damage to other structures will usually dominate the clinical picture.

The fourth nerve is one of the final common pathways for cortical systems that control eye movement in general. Cortical control of eye movement (saccades, smooth pursuit, accommodation) involves conjugate gaze, not unilateral eye movement.

=== Clinical assessment ===
The trochlear nerve is tested by examining the action of its muscle, the superior oblique. When acting on its own this muscle depresses and abducts the eyeball. However, movements of the eye by the extraocular muscles are synergistic (working together). Therefore, the trochlear nerve is tested by asking the patient to look 'down and in' as the contribution of the superior oblique is greatest in this motion. Common activities requiring this type of convergent gaze are reading the newspaper and walking down stairs. Diplopia associated with these activities may be the initial symptom of a fourth nerve palsy.

Alfred Bielschowsky's head tilt test is a test for palsy of the superior oblique muscle caused by damage to cranial nerve IV (trochlear nerve).

== Other animals ==
Homologous trochlear nerves are found in all jawed vertebrates. The unique features of the trochlear nerve, including its dorsal exit from the brainstem and its contralateral innervation, are seen in the primitive brains of sharks.

== Bibliography ==
- Blumenfeld H. Neuroanatomy Through Clinical Cases. Sinauer Associates, 2002
- Brodal A. Neurological Anatomy in Relation to Clinical Medicine, 3rd ed. Oxford University Press, 1981
- Brodal P. The Central Nervous System, 3rded. Oxford University Press, 2004
- Butler AB, Hodos W. Comparative Vertebrate Neuroanatomy, 2nd ed. Wiley-Interscience, 2005
- Carpenter MB. Core Text of Neuroanatomy, 4th ed. Williams & Wilkins, 1991
- Kandel ER, Schwartz JH, Jessell TM. Principles of Neural Science, 4th ed. McGraw-Hill, 2000
- Martin JH. Neuroanatomy Text and Atlas, 3rd ed. McGraw-Hill, 2003
- Patten J. Neurological Differential Diagnosis, 2nd ed. Springer, 1996
- Ropper, AH, Brown RH. Victor's Principles of Neurology, 8th ed. McGraw-Hill, 2005
- Standring S (ed.) Gray's Anatomy, 39th edition. Elsevier Churchill Livingstone, 2005
- Wilson-Pauwels L, Akesson EJ, Stewart PA. Cranial Nerves: Anatomy and Clinical Comments. Decker, 1998

== Additional images ==
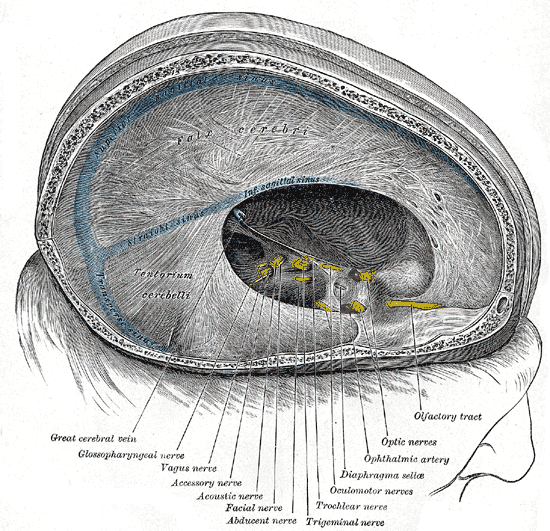
Dura mater and its processes exposed by removing part of the right half of the skull, and the brain.

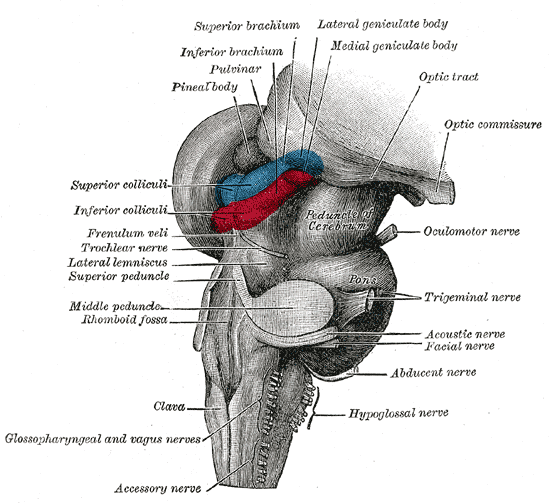
Hind- and mid-brains; postero-lateral view.

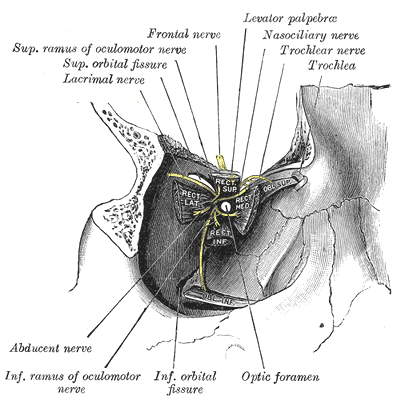
Dissection showing origins of right ocular muscles, and nerves entering by the superior orbital fissure.

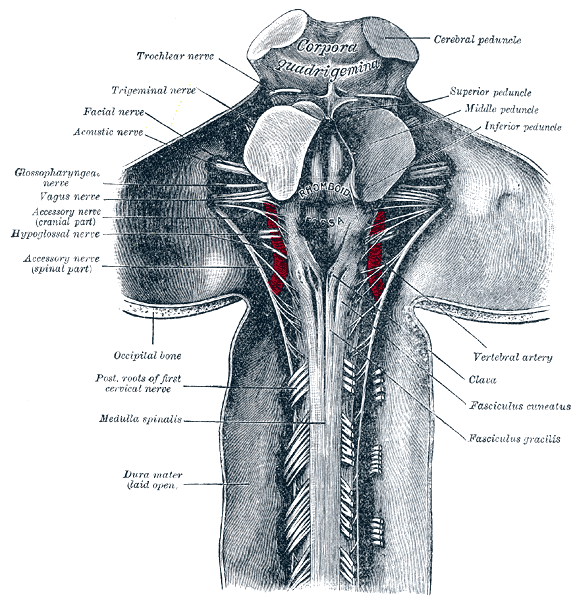
Upper part of medulla spinalis and hind- and mid-brains; posterior aspect, exposed in situ.

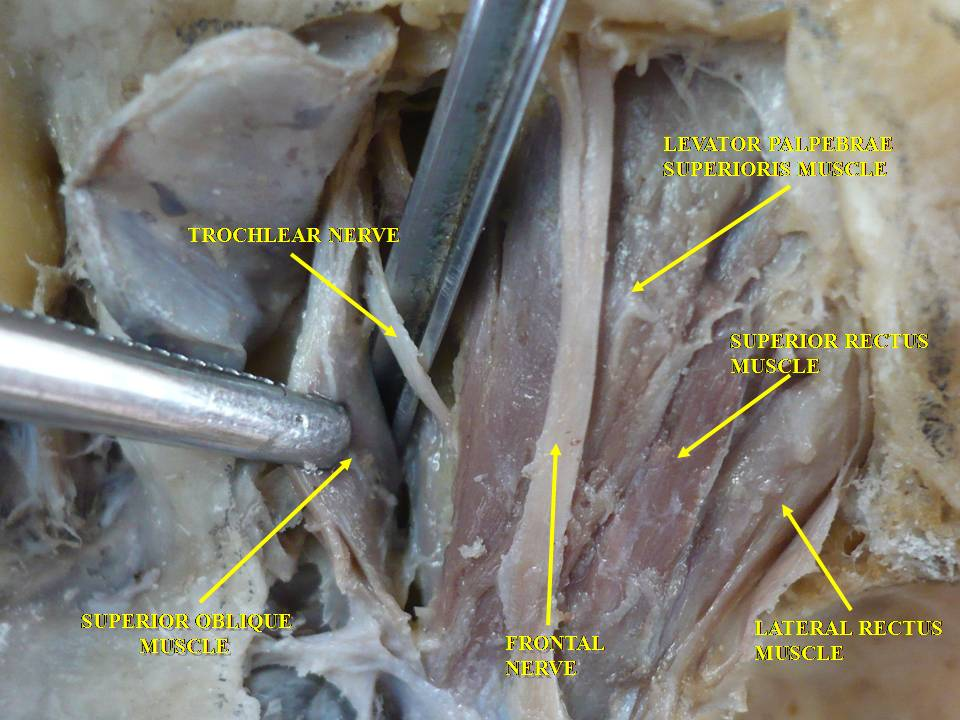
Trochlear nerve.Deep dissection.Superior view.
