= Trochlear nucleus =

Motor nucleus of cranial nerve IV

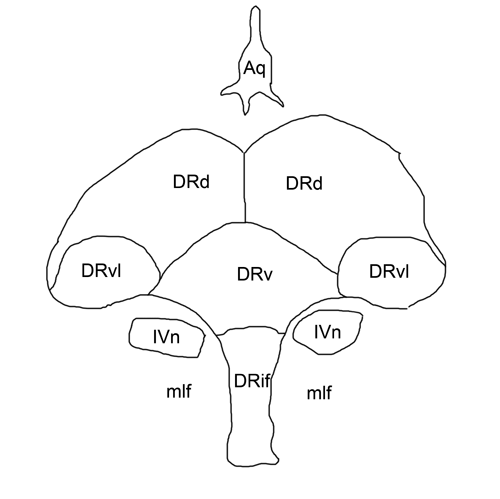
- Outline of the nucleus raphes dorsalis: DRif interfascicular subnucleus, DRv ventral subnucleus DRvl ventrolateral subnucleus DRd dorsal subnucleus mlf medial longitudinal fasciculus Aq cerebral aqueduct IVn trochlear nucleus.

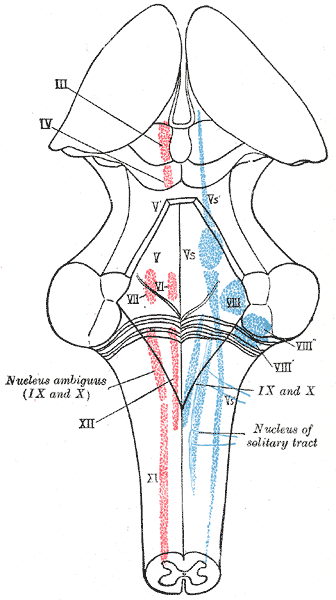
- The cranial nerve nuclei schematically represented; dorsal view. Motor nuclei in red; sensory in blue. (Trochlear is "IV")

Details

Identifiers
- Latin: nucleus nervi trochlearis
- NeuroNames: 513
- NeuroLex ID: birnlex_1488
- TA98: A14.1.06.319
- TA2: 5890
- FMA: 54518

The trochlear nucleus (/ˈtrɒklɪər/) is the motor nucleus of the trochlear nerve (cranial nerve IV). It is located in the medial midbrain.

== Structure ==
The trochlear nucleus is located in the midbrain, at an intercollicular level between the superior colliculus and inferior colliculus. As with all motor nuclei of cranial nerves, it is located near the midline (i.e. in the medial midbrain). It is embedded within the medial longitudinal fasciculus. It is situated immediately below the nucleus of the oculomotor nerve (CN III) (the only other cranial nerve with a nucleus in the midbrain besides the mesencephalic nucleus of trigeminal nerve, which functions in preserving dentition).

The trochlear nucleus is unique in that its axons run dorsally and cross the midline at the trochlear decussation (located in the superior medullary velum) in the midbrain before emerging from the brainstem posteriorly/dorsally. In other words, trochlear nucleus on one side gives rise to the trochlear nerve on the contralateral side. A lesion of the trochlear nucleus thus affects the contralateral eye, whereas lesions of all other cranial nuclei affect the ipsilateral side.

=== Blood supply ===
The midbrain receives its arterial blood supply from the posterior cerebral artery, superior cerebellar artery, and basilar artery; disruption of blood flow through any of these vessels may disrupt blood supply to the trochlear nucleus.

== Additional images ==
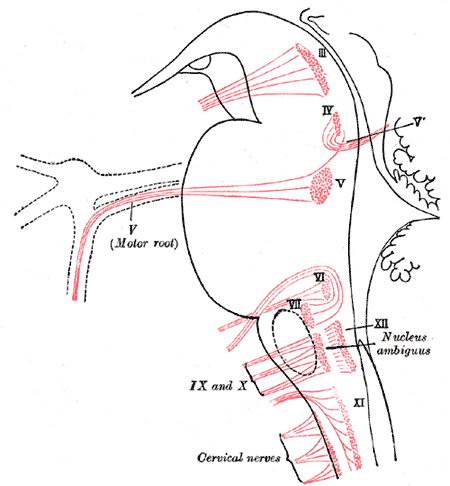
Nuclei of origin of cranial motor nerves schematically represented; lateral view.

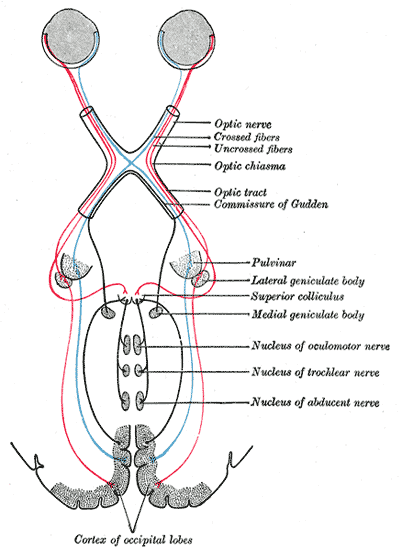
Scheme showing central connections of the optic nerves and optic tracts.

Brain stem sagittal section
