= Medial longitudinal fasciculus =

Nerve tracts in the brainstem

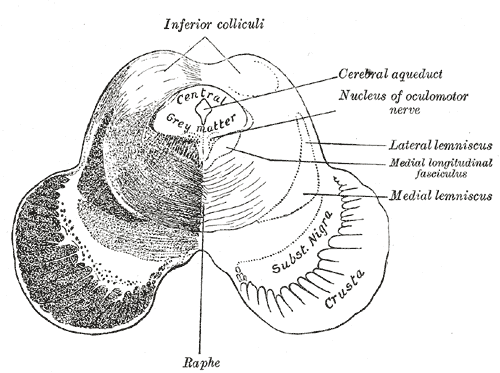
- Transverse section of mid-brain at level of inferior colliculi. (Medial longitudinal fasciculus labeled at center right.)

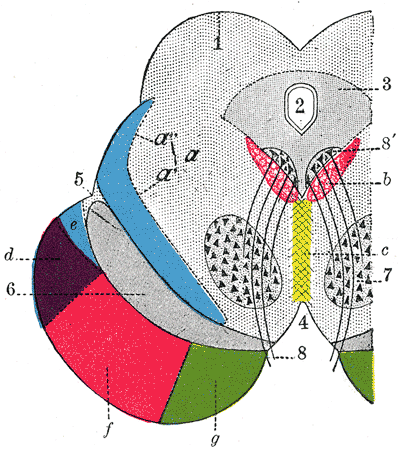
- Axial section through mid-brain.: 1. Corpora quadrigemina.; 2. Cerebral aqueduct.; 3. Central gray stratum.; 4. Interpeduncular space.; 5. Sulcus lateralis.; 6. Substantia nigra.; 7. Red nucleus of tegmentum.; 8. Oculomotor nerve, with 8’, its nucleus of origin. a. Lemniscus (in blue) with a’ the medial lemniscus and a" the lateral lemniscus. b. Medial longitudinal fasciculus. c. Raphe. d. Temporopontine fibers. e. Portion of medial lemniscus, which runs to the lentiform nucleus and insula. f. Cerebrospinal fibers. g. Frontopontine fibers.

Details

Identifiers
- Latin: fasciculus longitudinalis medialis
- NeuroNames: 1588, 784
- NeuroLex ID: nlx_144065
- TA98: A14.1.04.113; A14.1.05.304; A14.1.06.209
- TA2: 5867
- FMA: 83846

The medial longitudinal fasciculus (MLF) is a prominent bundle of nerve fibres which pass within the ventral/anterior portion of periaqueductal gray of the mesencephalon (midbrain). It contains the interstitial nucleus of Cajal, responsible for oculomotor control, head posture, and vertical eye movement.

The MLF interconnects interneurons of each abducens nucleus with motor neurons of the contralateral oculomotor nucleus; thus, the MLF mediates coordination of horizontal (side to side) eye movements, ensuring the two eyes move in unison (thus also enabling saccadic eye movements). The MLF also contains fibers projecting from the vestibular nuclei to the oculomotor and trochlear nuclei as well as the interstitial nucleus of Cajal; these connections ensure that eye movements are coordinated with head movements (as sensed by the vestibular system).

The medial longitudinal fasciculus is the main central connection for the oculomotor nerve, trochlear nerve, and abducens nerve. It carries information about the direction that the eyes should move. Lesions of the medial longitudinal fasciculus can cause nystagmus and diplopia, which may be associated with multiple sclerosis, a neoplasm, or a stroke.

== Anatomy ==
The MLF is the main intersegmental tract of the brainstem. It extends across the dorsal tegmentum of all three parts of the brainstem, as well as reaching caudally into the upper cervical spinal cord levels.

Descending fibers arise from the superior colliculus in the rostral midbrain (for visual reflexes), the accessory oculomotor nuclei in the rostral midbrain for visual tracking, and the pontine reticular formation, which facilitates extensor muscle tone. Ascending tracts arise from the vestibular nucleus and terminate in the oculomotor nucleus (of the oculomotor nerve, CN III), the trochlear nucleus (of the trochlear nerve, CN IV), and the abducens nucleus (of the abducens nerve, CN VI).

=== Structure ===
It contains the interstitial nucleus of Cajal, and the rostral interstitial nucleus (riMLF) (the vertical gaze center).

=== Pathways ===
==== Horizontal conjugate gaze ====
The paramedian pontine reticular formation (PPRF) is involved in coordinating horizontal conjugate eye movements and saccades. To do so, besides projecting to the ipsilateral abducens nucleus, the PPRF projects fibers through the MLF to the contralateral oculomotor nucleus (specifically, those of its motor neurons that innervate the medial rectus muscle).

==== Interstitial nucleus of Cajal ====
The interstitial nucleus of Cajal receives some ascending afferents from the vestibular nuclei via the MLF; the nucleus in turn projects descending efferents via the MLF back to the (superior and medial) vestibular nuclei, as well as to all levels of the spinal cord.

==== Vestibulo-ocular reflex ====
As part of the ascending MLF, the vestibular nuclei also project to the nuclei of all cranial nerves that control eye movements (i.e. oculomotor, abducens, and trochlear nuclei) to coordinate head-eye movements via the vestibulo-ocular reflex.

==== Perihypoglossal nuclei ====
The three perihypoglossal nuclei project efferents to the three cranial nerve nuclei controlling extrinsic eye muscles through the MLF.

==== Medial vestibulospinal tract ====
The vestibulocerebellum receives vestibulocerebellar fibers from the vestibular nuclei, then projects back to the vestibular nuclei to influence medial vestibulospinal tract (MVST). The MVST then projects bilaterally to cervical and upper thoracic levels of the spinal cord to control head/neck movements in order to coordinate head-eye movements. In the cervical spinal cord, it descends as a component of the descending MLF.

==== Tectospinal tract ====
The tectospinal tract originates in the superior colliculus and tectum of the mesencephalon (midbrain). It projects to the cervical and upper thoracic spinal cord to mediate reflex turning of the head and trunk in the direction of startling sensations. In the medulla oblongata, it descends within the MLF.

=== Relations ===
In the midbrain, the MLF is situated just ventral to the oculomotor and trochlear nuclei.

In the pons, the MLF is situated just ventral/anterior to the abducens nucleus.

== Clinical significance ==
A lesion of the medial longitudinal fasciculus produces slowed or absent adduction of the ipsilateral eye upon contralateral gaze. This is usually associated with involuntary jerky eye movements (nystagmus) of the abducting eye, a syndrome called internuclear ophthalmoplegia. Because multiple sclerosis causes demyelination of the axons of the central nervous system, it can cause internuclear ophthalmoplegia when medial longitudinal fasciculus axons get demyelinated. This presents as nystagmus and diplopia. Other demyelinating diseases, as well as certain neoplasms and strokes, can also cause the same symptoms.

== History ==
In 1846, neurologist Benedict Stilling first referred to the medial longitudinal fasciculus as the acusticus. This was followed by Theodor Meynert in 1872 calling it posterior. In 1891, Heinrich Schutz chose the name dorsal to describe the longitudinal bundle. This name stuck despite other authors attempting further renaming (Ramon y Cajal's periependymal in 1904, Theodor Ziehen's nubecula dorsalis in 1913). Finally, Wilhelm His Sr. changed the name to medial to comply with Basle nomenclature.

== Additional images ==
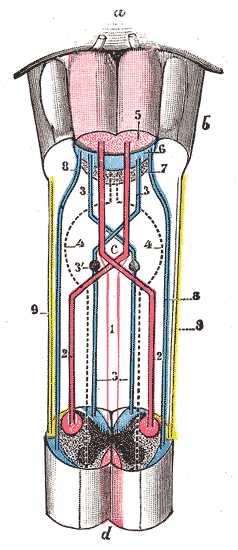
Decussation of pyramids.

== See also ==
- Listing's law
