= Vestibular nuclei =

Cranial nuclei for the vestibular nerve

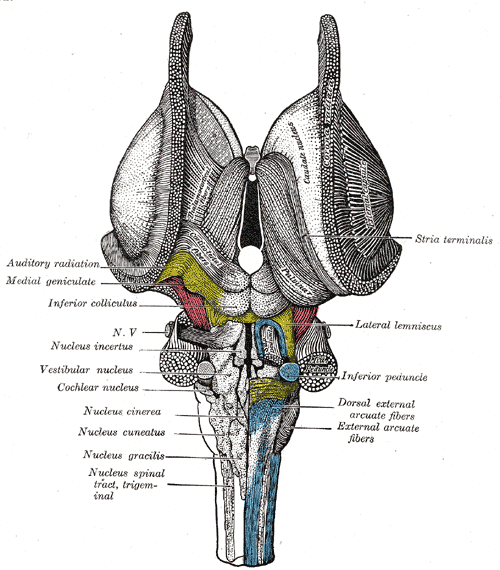
- Dissection of brainstem, dorsal view. Vestibular nucleus is labelled at left

Details
- Part of: Medulla
- System: Vestibular system
- Artery: AICA, PICA

Identifiers
- Latin: nuclei vestibulares
- MeSH: D014726
- NeuroNames: 714
- NeuroLex ID: birnlex_1337
- TA98: A14.1.04.242; A14.1.05.425
- TA2: 5933
- FMA: 72239

The vestibular nuclei (VN) are the cranial nuclei for the vestibular nerve located in the brainstem.

In Terminologia Anatomica, they are grouped in both the pons and the medulla in the brainstem.

== Structure ==
=== Path ===
The fibers of the vestibular nerve enter the medulla oblongata on the medial side of those of the cochlear, and pass between the inferior peduncle and the spinal tract of the trigeminal nerve.

They then divide into ascending and descending fibers. The latter end by arborizing around the cells of the medial nucleus, which is situated in the area acustica of the rhomboid fossa. The ascending fibers either end in the same manner or in the lateral nucleus, which is situated lateral to the area acustica and further from the ventricular floor.

Some of the axons of the cells of the lateral nucleus, and possibly also of the medial nucleus, are continued upward through the inferior peduncle to the roof nuclei of the opposite side of the cerebellum, to which also other fibers of the vestibular root are prolonged without interruption in the nuclei of the medulla oblongata.

A second set of fibers from the medial and lateral nuclei end partly in the tegmentum, while the remainder ascend in the medial longitudinal fasciculus to arborize around the cells of the nuclei of the oculomotor nerve.

Fibers from the lateral vestibular nucleus also pass via the vestibulospinal tract, to anterior horn cells at many levels in the spinal cord, in order to co-ordinate head and trunk movements.

=== Subnuclei ===
There are 4 subnuclei; they are situated at the floor of the fourth ventricle.

Name	Location	Notes
medial vestibular nucleus (dorsal or chief vestibular nucleus)	medulla (floor of fourth ventricle)	corresponding to the lower part of the area acustica in the rhomboid fossa; the caudal end of this nucleus is sometimes termed the descending or spinal vestibular nucleus. Its function is associated with VOR control. This nucleus is sometimes termed the nucleus of Schwalbe.
lateral vestibular nucleus or nucleus of Deiters	medulla (upper)	consisting of large cells and situated in the lateral angle of the rhomboid fossa. Its function is in controlling hindlimbs.
spinal vestibular nucleus	medulla (lower)	This nucleus is sometimes termed the nucleus of Roller. Also known as inferior vestibular nucleus. Has been associated to tail movement in mice.
superior vestibular nucleus	pons	This nucleus is sometimes termed the nucleus of Bechterew.

== See also ==
- Vestibular nerve
- Vestibulocerebellar syndrome
