= Oculomotor nucleus =

Cluster of neurons in the midbrain

- Section through superior colliculus showing path of oculomotor nerve.

- The cranial nerve nuclei schematically represented; dorsal view. Motor nuclei in red; sensory in blue. (Oculomotor is "III")

Details

Identifiers
- Latin: nucleus nervi oculomotorii
- MeSH: D065838
- NeuroNames: 492
- NeuroLex ID: birnlex_1240
- TA98: A14.1.06.302
- TA2: 5892
- FMA: 54510

The fibers of the oculomotor nerve arise from a nucleus in the midbrain, which lies in the gray substance of the floor of the cerebral aqueduct and extends in front of the aqueduct for a short distance into the floor of the third ventricle. From this nucleus the fibers pass forward through the tegmentum, the red nucleus, and the medial part of the substantia nigra, forming a series of curves with a lateral convexity, and emerge from the oculomotor sulcus on the medial side of the cerebral peduncle.

The nucleus of the oculomotor nerve does not consist of a continuous column of cells, but is broken up into a number of smaller nuclei, which are arranged in two groups, anterior and posterior. Those of the posterior group are six in number, five of which are symmetrical on the two sides of the middle line, while the sixth is centrally placed and is common to the nerves of both sides. The anterior group consists of two nuclei, an antero-medial and an antero-lateral.

The nucleus of the oculomotor nerve can be divided into several subnuclei, each controlling a particular muscle. The medial subnucleus controls the superior rectus muscle, notably of the contralateral side. All of the other subnuclei control ipsilateral extraocular muscles.

A nearby nucleus, the Edinger–Westphal nucleus lies dorsal to the main oculomotor nucleus. It is responsible for the parasympathetic functions of the oculomotor nerve, including pupillary constriction and lens accommodation.

== Additional images ==
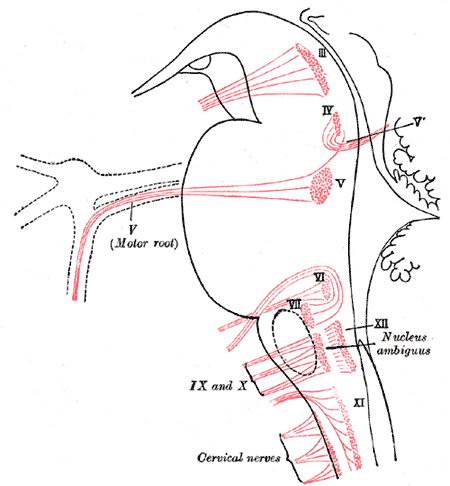
Nuclei of origin of cranial motor nerves schematically represented; lateral view.

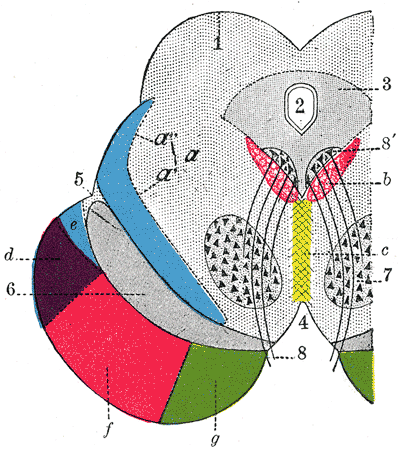
Coronal section through mid-brain.

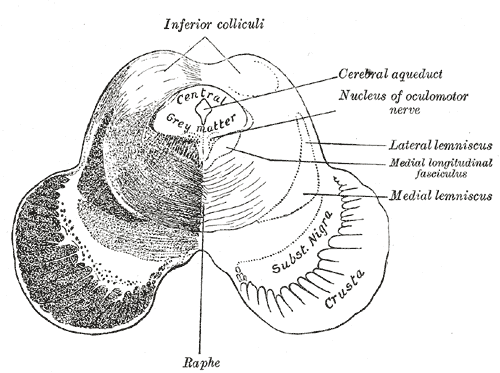
Transverse section of mid-brain at level of inferior colliculi.

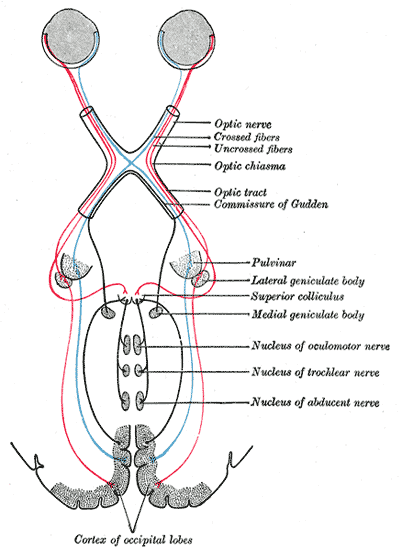
Scheme showing central connections of the optic nerves and optic tracts.

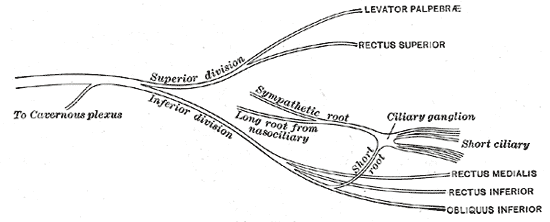
Plan of oculomotor nerve.

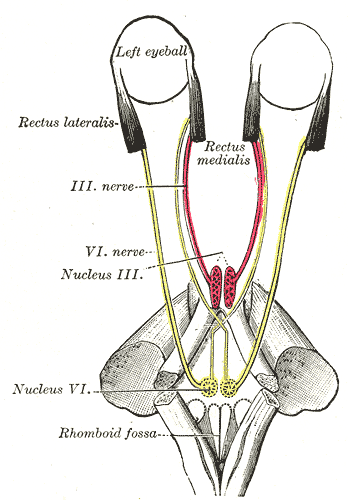
Figure showing the mode of innervation of the Recti medialis and lateralis of the eye.

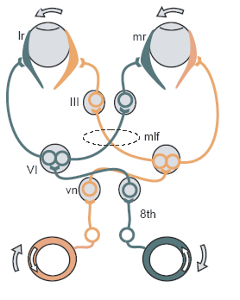
Vestibulo-ocular reflex
