= Basilar =

Basilar may refer to:

- Basilar artery
- Basilar artery migraines
- Basilar crackles
- Basilar crest
- Basilar membrane
- Basilar part of occipital bone
- Basilar part of pons
- Basilar plexus
- Basilar sinus
- Basilar skull fracture
- Basilar sulcus of the pons
