= Pontocerebellar fibers =

Second-order neuron fibers

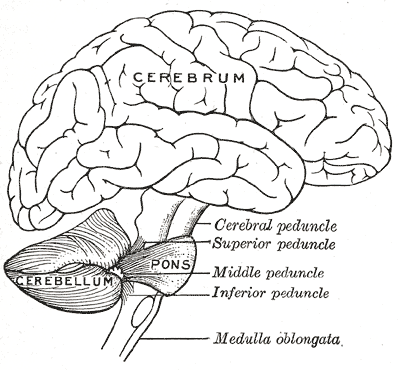
- Scheme showing the connections of the several parts of the brain.

Details

Identifiers
- Latin: fibrae pontocerebellares
- NeuroNames: 1345
- TA98: A14.1.05.110
- TA2: 5849
- FMA: 75215

The pontocerebellar fibers are the second-order neuron fibers of the corticopontocerebellar tracts that cross to the other side of the pons and run within the middle cerebellar peduncles, from the pons to the contralateral cerebellum. They arise from the pontine nuclei as the second part of the corticopontocerebellar tract (the first part being the corticopontine fibers which synapse in the pontine nuclei), and decussate (cross-over) in the pons before passing through the middle cerebellar peduncles to reach and terminate in the contralateral posterior lobe of the cerebellum (neocerebellum). It is part of a pathway involved in the coordination of voluntary movements.

The middle cerebellar peduncle consists entirely of pontocerebellar fibers and is the largest pathway of the cerebellum.

== Anatomy ==
The fibers are horizontally oriented, forming bundles which pass dorsally through the pons among the pontine nuclei and interweave with the perpendicularly oriented corticospinal fibers.

=== Termination ===
The pontocerebellar fibers terminate throughout the cerebellar cortex except the flocculonodular lobe in an arrangement corresponding to the cortical origin of the pathway: efferents of the primary motor cortex project to the vermis and paravermal zone; efferents of the premotor, somatosensory, and association cortex project to the cerebellar hemisphere cortex. Additionally, the fibers also issue collaterals to the dentate nucleus.

=== Pathway ===
The entire pathway begins and ends in the cerebral cortex, and its entire course is the following:

(Motor and sensory areas of) cerebral cortex → corticopontine fibers → (ipsilateral) nuclei pontis (synapse) → pontocerebellar fibers (decussation within pons) → middle cerebellar peduncle → (contralateral) (cerebellar cortex and (collaterals) dentate nucleus of) posterior lobe of cerebellum (synapse) → cerebellothalamic tract → superior cerebellar peduncle → mesencephalon (midbrain) (decussation of tract at level of inferior colliculus) → (ipsilateral) (ventral lateral nucleus of) thalamus → (ipsilateral) motor (cerebral) cortex (predominately premotor cortex and primary motor cortex)

== Clinical significance ==
Damage to the pontocerebellar fibers (or pontine nuclei) will result in contralateral ataxia: due to the double decussation of the pathway along its entire course, it terminates in the motor cortex of the same cerebral hemisphere in which it began; the motor lateral corticospinal tract then decussates once during its descent to control movement of the opposite side of the body.
