= Inferior petrosal sinus =

Vein channel in the skull

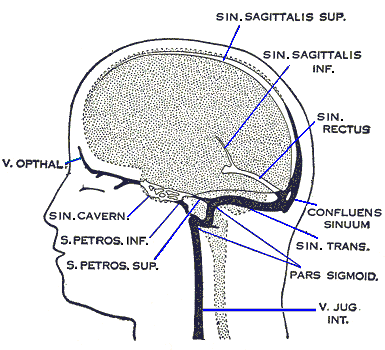
- Dural veins

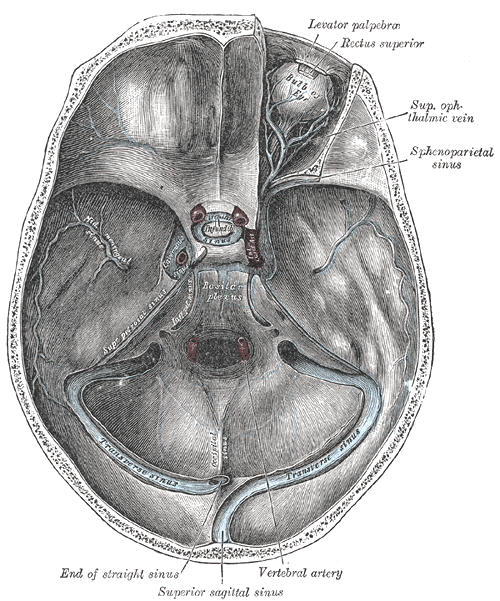
- The sinuses at the base of the skull. (Inferior petrosal sinus visible at center, between superior petrosal sinus and basilar plexus.)

Details
- Source: Cavernous sinus
- Drains to: Internal jugular vein

Identifiers
- Latin: sinus petrosus inferior
- TA98: A12.3.05.113
- TA2: 4858
- FMA: 50770

The inferior petrosal sinuses are two small sinuses situated on the inferior border of the petrous part of the temporal bone, one on each side. Each inferior petrosal sinus drains the cavernous sinus into the internal jugular vein.

== Structure ==
The inferior petrosal sinus is situated in the inferior petrosal sulcus, formed by the junction of the petrous part of the temporal bone with the basilar part of the occipital bone. It begins below and behind the cavernous sinus and, passing through the anterior part of the jugular foramen, ends in the superior bulb of the internal jugular vein.

== Function ==
The inferior petrosal sinus receives the internal auditory veins and also veins from the medulla oblongata, pons, and under surface of the cerebellum.

== Additional images ==
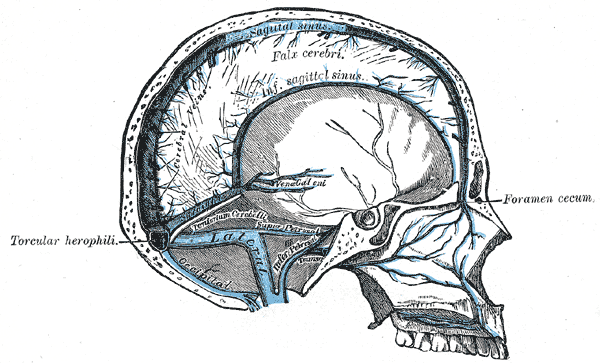
Sagittal section of the skull, showing the sinuses of the dura.

== See also ==
- Dural venous sinuses
- Inferior petrosal sinus sampling
