= Vascular dementia =

Dementia resulting from stroke

- Other names: Dementia due to cerebrovascular disease; Vascular cognitive impairment
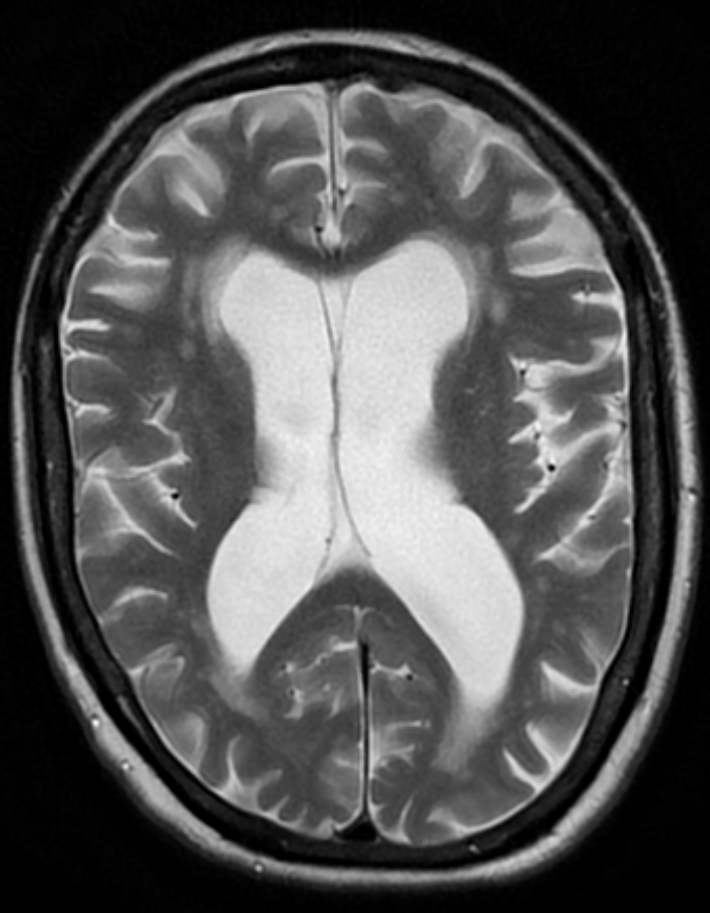
- Brain atrophy from vascular dementia
- Specialty: Neurology, psychiatry
- Symptoms: Cognitive impairment, short-term memory loss
- Complications: Heart disease, loss of ability to care for self and interact, pneumonia
- Causes: Conditions that impair blood vessels in the brain and therefore interfere with oxygen delivery to the brain
- Risk factors: High blood pressure, high cholesterol, atrial fibrillation, diabetes
- Diagnostic method: Lab test, neuroimaging test, neuropsychological testing
- Differential diagnosis: Alzheimer's disease
- Treatment: Symptomatic
- Frequency: 15–30% of dementia cases in the United States, Europe, and Asia

Vascular dementia is dementia caused by a series of strokes. Restricted blood flow due to strokes reduces oxygen and glucose delivery to the brain, causing cell injury and neurological deficits in the affected region. Subtypes of vascular dementia include subcortical vascular dementia, multi-infarct dementia, stroke-related dementia, and mixed dementia.

Subcortical vascular dementia occurs from damage to small blood vessels in the brain. Multi-infarct dementia results from a series of small strokes affecting several brain regions. Stroke-related dementia involving successive small strokes causes a more gradual decline in cognition. Dementia may occur when neurodegenerative and cerebrovascular pathologies are mixed, as in susceptible elderly people (75 years and older). Cognitive decline can be traced back to occurrence of successive strokes.

ICD-11 lists vascular dementia as dementia due to cerebrovascular disease. DSM-5 lists vascular dementia as either major or mild vascular neurocognitive disorder.

== Signs and symptoms ==
People with vascular dementia experience progressive cognitive impairment, either acutely or sub-acutely, as seen in mild cognitive impairment, but often in step-wise declines following multiple strokes.

The disease is described as both a mental and behavioral disorder within the ICD-11. Signs and symptoms are cognitive, motor, behavioral, and for a significant proportion of people, also affective. These changes typically occur over a period of 5–10 years. Signs are typically similar to those in other dementias but mainly include cognitive decline and memory impairment of sufficient severity to interfere with activities of daily living, sometimes accompanied by focal neurological signs and evidence of cerebrovascular disease features seen on brain imaging (e.g., CT scans or magnetic resonance imaging).

The localizing neurological signs observed in areas of the brain include hemiparesis, bradykinesia, hyperreflexia, extensor plantar reflexes, ataxia, pseudobulbar palsy, as well as gait and swallowing difficulties. People have patchy deficits on cognitive testing. They tend to have better free recall and fewer memory errors (a.k.a. recall intrusions) than those with Alzheimer's disease. In more severely affected people, or those with infarcts in Wernicke's or Broca's areas, specific speech problems called dysarthria and aphasia may occur.

In small vessel disease, the frontal lobes are often affected. Consequently, people with vascular dementia tend to perform worse than those with Alzheimer's disease on frontal lobe-heavy tasks, such as those involving verbal fluency. They may present with frontal lobe problems, such as apathy, abulia (i.e., lack of will or initiative), difficulties with attention and orientation, and urinary incontinence. They tend to exhibit more perseverative behavior. People with vascular dementia may also present with general slowing of processing ability, difficulty shifting sets, and impairment in abstract thinking. Apathy early in the disease is more suggestive of vascular dementia.

Rare genetic disorders that cause vascular lesions in the brain exhibit other clinical presentations. As a rule, they tend to occur earlier in life and have a more aggressive course. In addition, some infectious diseases, such as neurosyphilis, can cause arterial damage, strokes, and bacterial inflammation of the brain.

== Causes ==
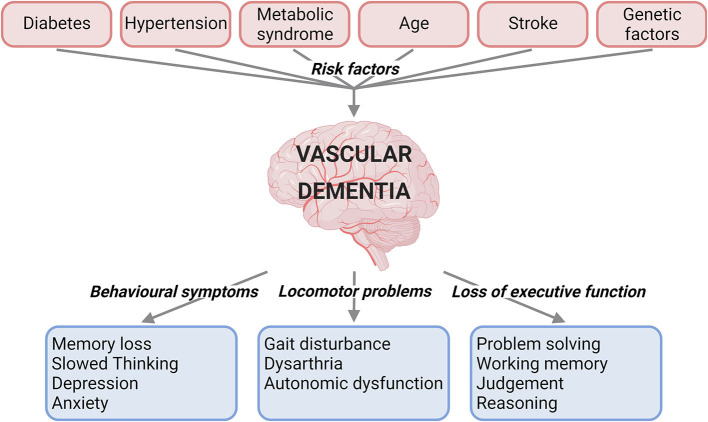
Risk factors and clinical characteristics for vascular dementia

Vascular dementia can be caused by ischemic or hemorrhagic infarcts affecting multiple brain areas, including the anterior cerebral artery territory, the parietal lobes, or the cingulate gyrus. On rare occasions, infarcts in the hippocampus or thalamus are the cause of dementia; thalamic infarcts may cause vascular thalamic amnesia. A history of stroke increases the risk of developing dementia by around 70%, and recent stroke increases the risk by around 120%. Brain vascular lesions can also be the result of diffuse cerebrovascular disease, such as small vessel disease.

=== Risk factors ===
Risk factors for vascular dementia include increasing age, hypertension, smoking, hypercholesterolemia, diabetes mellitus, cardiovascular disease, and cerebrovascular disease. Other risk factors include lifestyle, geographic origin, and APOE-ε4 genotype.

Vascular dementia can sometimes be triggered by cerebral amyloid angiopathy, which involves the accumulation of amyloid beta plaques in the walls of the cerebral arteries, leading to breakdown and rupture of the vessels. Since amyloid plaques are a characteristic feature of Alzheimer's disease, vascular dementia may occur as a consequence.

== Diagnosis ==
Several specific diagnostic criteria can be used to diagnose vascular dementia, including the Diagnostic and Statistical Manual of Mental Disorders, Fourth Edition (DSM-IV) criteria, the International Classification of Diseases, Tenth Edition (ICD-10) criteria, the National Institute of Neurological Disorders and Stroke criteria, Association Internationale pour la Recherche et l'Enseignement en Neurosciences (NINDS-AIREN) criteria, the Alzheimer's Disease Diagnostic and Treatment Center criteria, and the Hachinski Ischemic Score (after Vladimir Hachinski).

The recommended investigations for cognitive impairment include: blood tests (for anemia, vitamin deficiency, thyrotoxicosis, infection, among others), chest X-ray, ECG, and neuroimaging, preferably a scan with a functional or metabolic sensitivity beyond a simple CT or MRI. When available as a diagnostic tool, single photon emission computed tomography (SPECT) and positron emission tomography (PET) neuroimaging may be used to confirm a diagnosis of multi-infarct dementia in conjunction with evaluations involving mental status examination.

In a person already having dementia, SPECT appears to be superior in differentiating multi-infarct dementia from Alzheimer's disease, compared to the usual mental testing and medical history analysis.

The screening blood tests typically include full blood count, liver function tests, thyroid function tests, lipid profile, erythrocyte sedimentation rate, C reactive protein, syphilis serology, calcium serum level, fasting glucose, urea, electrolytes, vitamin B-12, and folate.

=== Differential diagnosis ===
Differentiating dementia syndromes can be challenging, due to the frequently overlapping clinical features and related underlying pathology. Mixed dementia, involving two types of dementia, can occur. In particular, Alzheimer's disease often co-occurs with vascular dementia.

Mixed dementia is diagnosed when people have evidence of Alzheimer's disease and cerebrovascular disease, either clinically or based on neuro-imaging evidence of ischemic lesions.

=== Pathology ===
Gross examination of the brain may reveal noticeable lesions and damage to blood vessels. Accumulation of various substances such as lipid deposits and clotted blood appear on microscopic views. The white matter is substantially affected, with noticeable atrophy (tissue loss), in addition to calcification of the arteries. Microinfarcts may also be present in the gray matter (cerebral cortex), sometimes in large numbers.

Although atheroma of the major cerebral arteries is typical in vascular dementia, smaller vessels and arterioles are mainly affected.

== Prevention ==
Early detection and accurate diagnosis are important, as vascular dementia is at least partially preventable. Ischemic changes in the brain are irreversible, but the person with vascular dementia can demonstrate periods of stability or even mild improvement. Since stroke is an essential part of vascular dementia, the goal is to prevent new strokes. This is attempted through reduction of stroke risk factors, such as high blood pressure, high blood lipid levels, atrial fibrillation, or diabetes mellitus.

Medications for high blood pressure are used to prevent pre-stroke dementia. These medications include angiotensin converting enzyme inhibitors, diuretics, calcium channel blockers, sympathetic nerve inhibitors, angiotensin II receptor antagonists or adrenergic antagonists.

A 2023 review found that therapy with statin drugs was ineffective in treating or preventing stroke or dementia in people without a history of cerebrovascular disease.

== Treatment ==
As of 2025, there are no medications used specifically for prevention or treatment of vascular dementia. However, medicines and other therapies can be used to slow progression of the disease.

== Prognosis ==
Many studies have been conducted to determine the average survival of people with dementia. The studies were frequently small and limited, which caused contradictory results in the connection between mortality and the type of dementia and the person's gender. One 2015 study found that the one-year mortality was three to four times higher in people after their first referral to a day clinic for dementia, when compared to the general population. If the person was hospitalized for dementia, the mortality was even higher than in people hospitalized for cardiovascular disease. Vascular dementia was found to have either comparable or worse survival rates when compared to Alzheimer's disease; another 2014 study found that the prognosis for people with vascular dementia was worse for male and older people.

Vascular dementia may be a direct cause of death due to the possibility of a fatal interruption in the brain's blood supply.

== Epidemiology ==
Vascular dementia is the second-most-common form of dementia after Alzheimer's disease in older adults. The prevalence of the illness is 1.5% in Western countries and approximately 2.2% in Japan. It accounts for 50% of all dementias in Japan, 20% to 40% in Europe, and 15% in Latin America. 25% of people with stroke develop new-onset dementia within one year of their stroke. One study found that in the United States, the prevalence of vascular dementia in all people over the age of 71 is 2.43%, and another found that the prevalence of the dementias doubles with every 5.1 years of age.

The incidence peaks between the fourth and the seventh decades of life and 80% of people have a history of hypertension.

A 2018 meta-analysis identified 36 studies of prevalent stroke (1.9 million participants) and 12 studies of incident stroke (1.3 million participants). For prevalent stroke, the pooled hazard ratio for all-cause dementia was 1.69; for incident stroke, the pooled risk ratio was 2.18. Study characteristics did not modify these associations, with the exception of sex, which explained 50.2% of between-study heterogeneity for prevalent stroke. These results confirm that stroke is a strong, independent, and potentially modifiable risk factor for all-cause dementia.

== See also ==
- Binswanger's disease
