= Lacunar stroke =

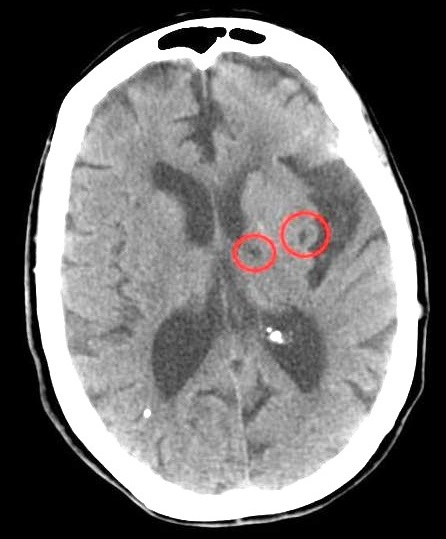
- CT scan of two lacunar strokes.
- Specialty: Neurology

Lacunar stroke or lacunar cerebral infarct (LACI) is the most common type of ischemic stroke, resulting from the occlusion of small penetrating arteries that provide blood to the brain's deep structures. Patients who present with symptoms of a lacunar stroke, but who have not yet had diagnostic imaging performed, may be described as having lacunar stroke syndrome (LACS).

Much of the current knowledge of lacunar strokes comes from C. Miller Fisher's cadaver dissections of post-mortem stroke patients. He observed "lacunae" (empty spaces) in the deep brain structures after occlusion of 200–800 μm penetrating arteries and connected them with five classic syndromes. These syndromes are still noted today, though lacunar infarcts are diagnosed based on clinical judgment and radiologic imaging.

== Signs and symptoms ==
Each of the five classical lacunar syndromes has a relatively distinct symptom complex. Symptoms may occur suddenly, progressively, or in a fluctuating (e.g., the capsular warning syndrome) manner. Occasionally, cortical infarcts and intracranial hemorrhages can mimic lacunar infarcts, but true cortical signs (aphasia, visuospatial neglect, gaze deviation, and visual field defects) are always absent in lacunar strokes. The classic syndromes are as follows:

Name	Location of infarct	Presentation
Pure motor stroke/hemiparesis (most common lacunar syndrome: 33–50%)	posterior limb of the internal capsule, basilar part of pons, corona radiata	It is marked by hemiparesis or hemiplegia that typically affects the face, arm, or leg of the side of the body opposite the location of the infarct. Dysarthria, dysphagia, and transient sensory symptoms may also be present.
Ataxic hemiparesis (second most frequent lacunar syndrome)	posterior limb of the internal capsule, basilar part of pons, and corona radiata, red nucleus, lentiform nucleus, superior cerebellar artery infarcts, anterior cerebral artery infarcts	It displays a combination of cerebellar and motor symptoms, including weakness and clumsiness, on the ipsilateral side of the body. It usually affects the leg more than it does the arm; hence, it is known also as homolateral ataxia and crural paresis. The onset of symptoms is often over hours or days.
Dysarthria/clumsy hand (sometimes considered a variant of ataxic hemiparesis, but usually still is classified as a separate lacunar syndrome)	basilar part of pons, anterior limb or genu of internal capsule, corona radiata, basal ganglia, thalamus, cerebral peduncle	The main symptoms are dysarthria and clumsiness (i.e., weakness) of the hand, which often are most prominent when the patient is writing; but dysarthria or involuntary movement can also be seen in legs.
Pure sensory stroke	contralateral thalamus (VPL), internal capsule, corona radiata, midbrain	Marked by numbness (loss of sensation) on one side of the body; can later develop tingling, pain, burning, or another unpleasant sensation on one side of the body.
Mixed sensorimotor stroke	thalamus and adjacent posterior internal capsule, lateral pons	This lacunar syndrome involves hemiparesis (weakness) or hemiplegia (paralysis) with sensory impairment, both on the contralateral side to the infarction.

== Silent lacunar infarction ==
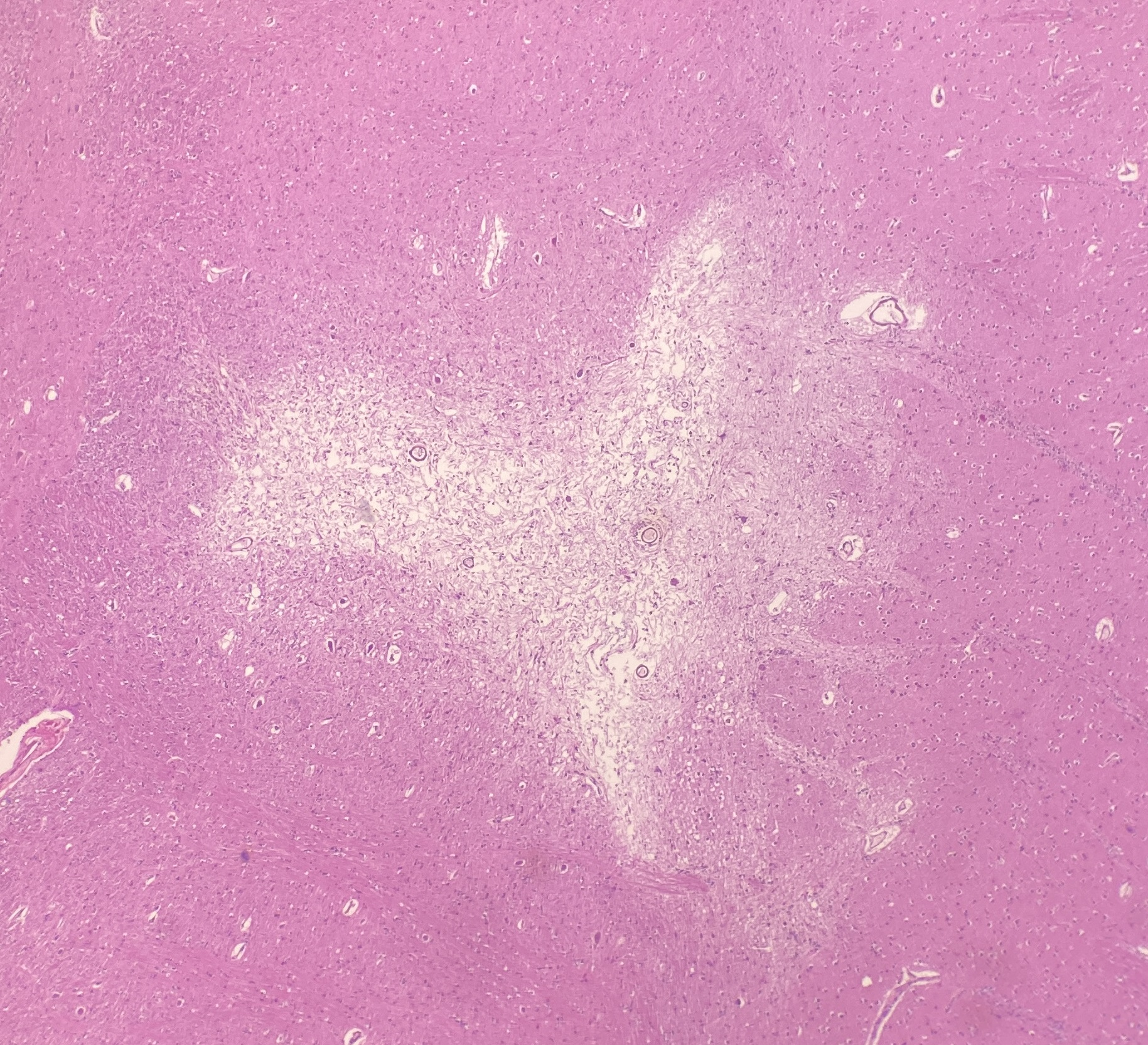
Histopathology of a small lacunar infarct discovered incidentally on autopsy.

A silent lacunar infarction (SLI) is one type of silent stroke which usually shows no identifiable outward symptoms, and is thus termed "silent". Because stroke is a clinical diagnosis (that is, it is defined by clinical symptoms), there is debate about whether SLI are considered to be strokes, even though the pathophysiology is presumably the same. Individuals who have a SLI are often completely unaware they have had a stroke. This type of stroke often causes lesions in the surrounding brain tissue that are visibly detected via neuroimaging techniques such as MRI and computed axial tomography (CT scan). Silent strokes, including silent lacunar infarctions, have been shown to be much more common than previously thought, with an estimated prevalence rate of eleven million per year in the United States. Approximately 10% of these silent strokes are silent lacunar infarctions. While dubbed "silent" due to the immediate lack of classic stroke symptoms, SLIs can cause damage to the surrounding brain tissue and can affect various aspects of a person's mood, personality, and cognitive functioning. A SLI or any type of silent stroke places an individual at greater risk for future major stroke.

== Pathophysiology ==
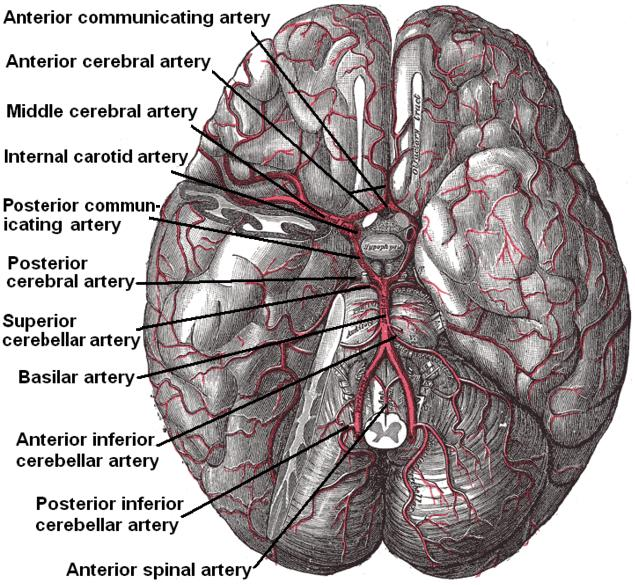
Small arteries beneath brain.

According to Koffler et al., lacunes are derived from an "occlusion of a single deep penetrating artery that arises directly from the constituents of the circle of Willis, cerebellar arteries, and basilar artery". Other lesions that are associated with lacunes appear in the "deep nuclei of the brain (37% putamen, 14% thalamus, and 10% caudate) as well as the pons (16%) or the posterior limb of the internal capsule (10%)". These lesions are less common within other brain regions such as the cerebellum, cerebral white matter and anterior limb of the internal capsule.

The two proposed mechanisms are microatheroma and lipohyalinosis. At the beginning, lipohyalinosis was thought to be the main small vessel pathology, but microatheroma now is thought to be the most common mechanism of arterial occlusion (or stenosis). Occasionally, atheroma in the parent artery blocks the orifice of the penetrating artery (luminal atheroma), or atheroma involves the origin of the penetrating artery (junctional atheroma). Alternatively, hypoperfusion is believed to be the mechanism when there is stenosis of the penetrating artery. When no evidence of small vessel disease is found on histologic examination, an embolic cause is assumed, either artery-to-artery embolism or cardioembolism. In one recent series, 25% of patients with clinical radiologically defined lacunes had a potential cardiac cause for their strokes.

More recent advances have also suggested these mechanisms may play a combined role in the aetiology of lacunar infarction. The most current theory indicates endothelial dysfunction and increased permeability of the blood-brain barrier first allow leakage of blood contents, promoting gliosis and white matter hyper-intensities on magnetic resonance imaging. Moreover, focal narrowing of brain vessels and impairment of their ability to dilate in response to various stimuli may lead to a decreased cerebral blood flow and ultimately lacunar stroke.

Advanced age, chronic hypertension, smoking and diabetes mellitus are risk factors. It is unclear whether there is an association with alcohol consumption, elevated cholesterol, or history of prior stroke. Lacunar strokes may result from carotid artery pathology or microemboli from the heart as in atrial fibrillation. Patients often recover well, but if there is enough white matter disease from lacunar pathology, one can see a subcortical dementia such as Binswanger disease.

== Treatment and prognosis ==
Typically, tissue plasminogen activator may be administered within 3 to 4.5 hours of stroke onset if the patient is without contraindications (i.e. a bleeding diathesis such as recent major surgery or cancer with brain metastases). High dose aspirin can be given within 48 hours. For long term prevention of recurrence, medical regimens are typically aimed towards correcting the underlying risk factors for lacunar infarcts such as hypertension, diabetes mellitus and cigarette smoking. Anticoagulants such as heparin and warfarin have shown no benefit over aspirin with regards to five-year survival.

Patients who have lacunar strokes have a greater chance of surviving beyond thirty days (96%) than those with other types of stroke (85%), and better survival beyond a year (87% versus 65-70%). Between 70% and 80% are functionally independent at 1 year, compared with fewer than 50% otherwise.

Occupational therapy and physical therapy interventions are used in the rehabilitation of lacunar stroke. A physiotherapy program will improve joint range of motion of the paretic limb using passive range of motion exercises. When increases in activity are tolerated, and stability improvements are made, patients will progress from rolling to side-lying, to standing (with progressions to prone, quadruped, bridging, long-sitting and kneeling for example) and learn to transfer safely (from their bed to a chair or from a wheel chair to a car for example). Assistance and ambulation aids are used as required as the patient begins walking and lessened as function increases. Furthermore, splints and braces can be used to support limbs and joints to prevent or treat complications such as contractures and spasticity. The rehabilitation healthcare team should also educate the patient and their family on common stroke symptoms and how to manage an onset of stroke. Continuing follow-up with a physician is essential so that the physician may monitor medication dosage and risk factors.

== Epidemiology ==
It is estimated that lacunar infarcts account for 25% of all ischemic strokes, with an annual incidence of approximately 15 per 100,000 people. They may be more frequent in men and in people of African, Mexican, and Hong Kong Chinese descent.
