= Corticopontocerebellar tract =

The term "corticopontocerebellar fibers" refers to the entire pathway from the cerebral cortex to the contralateral cerebellum.

- Corticopontine fibers
- Pontocerebellar fibers
