= Microangiopathy =

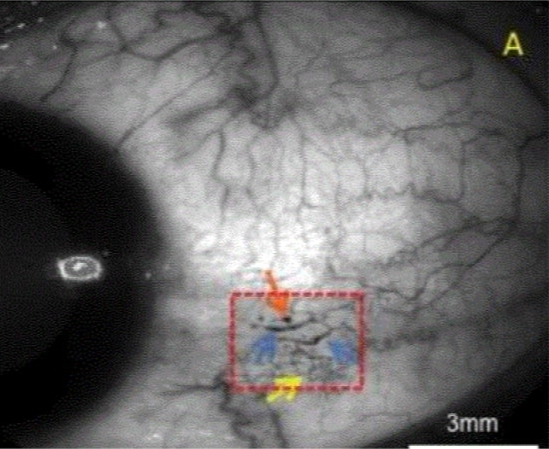
- A case of conjunctival microangiopathy (red dashed-square) secondary to diabetes demonstrating a microaneurysm (orange arrow), vessel dilatation (blue arrows), and vascular tortuosity (yellow arrow).
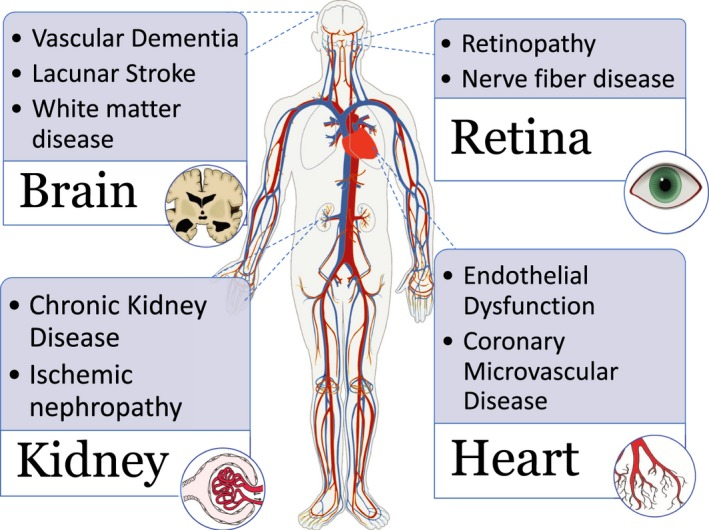
- Examples of microvascular diseases.

Microangiopathy (also known as microvascular disease, small vessel disease (SVD) or microvascular dysfunction) is a disease of the microvessels, small blood vessels in the microcirculation. It can be contrasted to macroangiopathies such as atherosclerosis, where large and medium-sized arteries (e.g., aorta, carotid and coronary arteries) are primarily affected.

Small vessel diseases (SVDs) affect primarily organs that receive significant portions of cardiac output such as the brain, the kidney, and the retina. Thus, SVDs are a major etiologic cause in debilitating conditions such as renal failure, blindness, lacunar infarcts, and dementia.

== Types ==
Microangiopathies are involved in a variety of different diseases including:

- Diabetic microangiopathy, mainly as diabetic retinopathy, nephropathy and neuropathy. Nevertheless, diabetic microvascular dysfunction is not limited to the eyes, kidneys, and nerves, but can also affect other organs such as the skin, muscles, heart, and brain.
- Coronary microvascular diseases (CMDs), which are a group of conditions affecting the microvasculature in the heart and include microvascular angina, previously known as cardiac syndrome X.
- Cerebral small vessel diseases (CSVDs), which include arteriosclerosis-related CSVD as in hypertension, amyloid-related CSVD as in Alzheimer's disease and other genetic, inflammatory-mediated and immune-mediated CSVDs.
- Thrombotic microangiopathies, pseudo-thrombotic microangiopathy and microangiopathies in a wide range of diseases including COVID-19 infection, chronic kidney disease, chronic venous insufficiency, systemic scleroderma and other connective tissue diseases (CTDs) associated with peripheral vascular syndrome, sarcoidosis, amyloidosis and even with long-haul flights.

== Pathophysiology ==
The main target of small vessel diseases is the endothelium, which plays a key role in vascular homeostasis. The pathogenesis of SVDs in various organs is characterized by endothelial dysfunction, capillary rarefaction, microthrombi and microvascular remodeling.

Diabetic microangiopathy, which is the most common cause of microangiopathy, is more prevalent in the kidney, retina and vascular endothelium since glucose transport in these sites isn't regulated by insulin and these tissues cannot stop glucose from entering cells when blood sugar levels are high. Among all biochemical mechanisms involved in diabetic vascular damage such as the polyol pathway and the renin–angiotensin system (RAS), the advanced glycation end products (AGEs) pathway appears to be the most important in the pathogenesis and progression of microvascular complications.

Chronic high blood sugar levels lead to the attachment of sugar molecules to various proteins, including collagen, laminin, and peripheral nerve proteins. This process, called glycosylation, creates advanced glycation end products (AGEs). AGEs formation cross-links these proteins, making them resistant to degradation. This leads to accumulation of AGEs, thickening of the basement membrane, narrowing the blood vessels, reducing blood flow to the tissues and causing ischemic injury.

In addition, oxidative stress, caused by AGEs and the other pathways, causes apoptosis of pericytes and podocytes in the retina and the kidneys respectively leading to capillary wall fragility and increased vascular leakage. This results in local swelling (e.g. macular edema) and impaired tissue function.

=== Microvascular diseases as a multisystem disorder ===
Some researchers have suggested that SVD may be a multisystem disorder, meaning that it can affect multiple organs in the body, including the heart and brain. This is supported by multiple studies stating that cardiac pathologies are more prevalent in patients with pathological evidence of cerebrovascular SVD and vice versa.

Coronary microvascular diseases (CMDs) can be caused by:

- Structural changes, such as vascular remodeling and increased thickness and hypertrophy of arterial walls present in hypertrophic cardiomyopathy.
- Functional changes, such as endothelial dysfunction caused by oxidative damage as in smoking.
- Extravascular changes, such as left ventricular hypertrophy and high left ventricular pressure as a result of aortic stenosis (AS).

On the other hand, Cerebral SVD encompasses a range of vascular pathologies including arteriosclerosis-related CSVD, where lipohyalinosis causes stenosis of the lumen of the arterioles and amyloid-related CSVD, characterized by the build-up of β-amyloid deposits in small- and medium-caliber cerebral vessels.

The vascular anatomy of the heart and brain is similar in that conduit arteries are distributed on the surface of these organs with tissue perfusion achieved through deep penetrating arteries. Both coronary and cerebral microvascular diseases do share some common risk factors such as hypertension. Why some patients with microvascular angina subsequently develop vascular cognitive impairment and others do not is an unanswered question. Potential underpinning mechanisms include premature vascular aging and clustering of vascular risk factors leading to an accelerated cardiovascular risk.

== Diagnosis ==
The diagnosis of microangiopathies can be based on direct visualization of the microcirculation, imaging modalities (e.g. MRI), conventional testings (e.g. ophthalmoscopy for diabetic retinopathy) or other diagnostic measures (e.g. blood smear for schistocytes in thrombotic microangiopathies).

For assessment of the morphological and functional aspects of microcirculation, nailfold videocapillaroscopy (NVC) can be used, in which videocapillaroscopy is performed at the nailfold, where capillaries are arranged with the longitudinal axis parallel to the skin surface, so that they can be examined along their entire length.

NVC has been largely used not only for investigating peripheral microangiopathy, but also as a sort of "window" to systemic microvascular dysfunction. Although its main application is within the connective tissue diseases such as systemic scleroderma and dermatomyositis, it has been employed in non-rheumatic diseases with microvascular involvement such as diabetes mellitus, essential hypertension and COVID-19 infection.

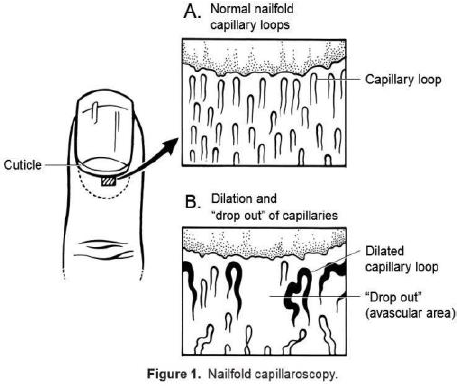
Nailfold capillaroscopy

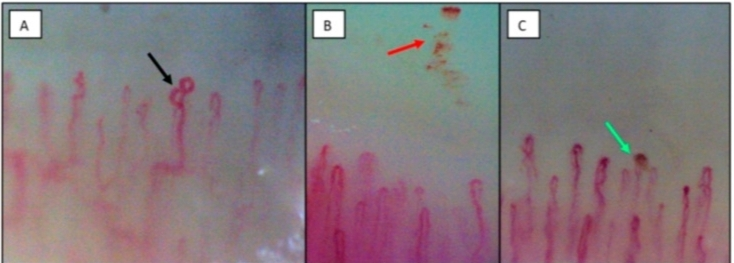
Capillaroscopic findings in patients with mild COVID-19: 1. Enlarged loops (Black arrow); 2. Microhemorrhages (Red arrow); 3. Microthrombosis (Green arrow)

Optical coherence tomography angiography (OCTA) is another imaging modality that offers high-resolution visualization of the retinal capillary network and can be used to evaluate microcirculation in conditions such as diabetic retinopathy. Many studies have demonstrated that evaluation of the retinal microvascular changes using OCTA or other methods such as fluorescein angiography may reflect the systemic microvascular functions as in patients with coronary microvascular disease, cerebral small vessel diseases or systemic sclerosis (The potential of retinal microvascularopathy as a biomarker for assessing microvascular status of other circulations).

Unlike the retinal microcirculation, the coronary microvasculature cannot be directly imaged. Instead, a number of different tests can be used to measure how much blood is flowing through the coronary microvasculature. These tests can be used to assess how well the coronary microvasculature is functioning and to diagnose coronary microvascular disease. They include non-invasive measures such as cardiac MRI and invasive measures such as intracoronary Doppler wire.

Similarly, CSVD is typically recognized on both brain magnetic resonance imaging (MRI) and computed tomography (CT) scans, but MRI has greater sensitivity and specificity. Neuroimaging of CSVD primarily involves visualizing radiological phenotypes of CSVD such as recent subcortical infarcts or cerebral microbleeds (CMBs).

== Treatment ==
Treatment options of microangiopathies can be directed at:

- Prevention (e.g. maintaining good glycaemic control, screening for retinopathy and neuropathy and testing for albuminuria).
- Controlling symptoms and preventing further deterioration (e.g. tricyclic antidepressants and gabapentin for diabetic neuropathy).
- Drug therapy (e.g. antiplatelets (low-dose aspirin) and lipid-lowering therapy (statins) for management of CMDs).
- Diet and lifestyle modification (e.g. low-protein diet in diabetic nephropathy, smoking cessation, weight loss, improved nutrition, and regular exercise).
- Intensive management of coexisting conditions and risk factors (e.g. adequate control of blood pressure, diabetes and related metabolic abnormalities and lipid management).
- Other measures (e.g. photocoagulation in patients with severe proliferative diabetic retinopathy).
- Young people with extensive CSVD and few or no conventional vascular risk factors may benefit from genetic testing to identify any underlying genetic disorders that may be contributing to their condition (For Fabry disease, there is an enzyme replacement therapy).

A better understanding of the mechanisms leading to damage of small blood vessels may be associated with novel therapeutic approaches, the safety and efficacy of some of which will need to be further investigated. Examples include calcium dobesilate and aldose reductase inhibitors in diabetic microangiopathies and endothelin receptor antagonists for pulmonary hypertension.
