= Inferior cerebellar arteries =

Inferior cerebellar arteries may refer to:

- Anterior inferior cerebellar artery
- Posterior inferior cerebellar artery
