= Basilar part of pons =

Region of the brainstem

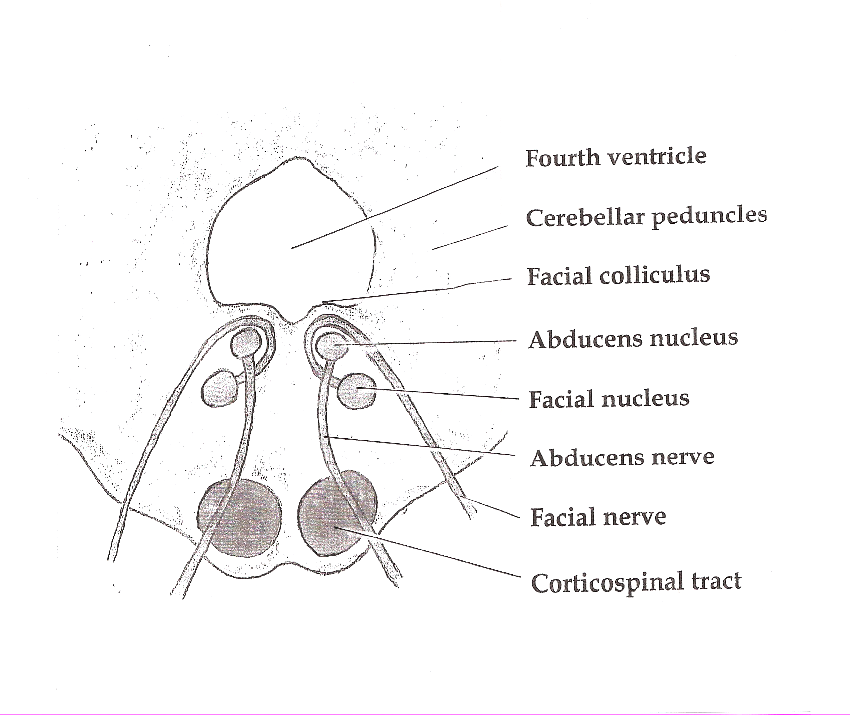
- Brainstem (basilar part of pons not labeled, but is visible at bottom)

Details

Identifiers
- Latin: Pars basilaris pontis, basis pontis
- NeuroNames: 616
- NeuroLex ID: birnlex_1043
- TA98: A14.1.05.101
- TA2: 5925
- FMA: 72244

The basilar part of pons, also known as basis pontis, or basilar pons, is the ventral part of the pons (ventral pons) in the brainstem; the dorsal part (dorsal pons) is known as the pontine tegmentum.

The basilar part of the pons makes up two thirds of the pons. It has a ridged appearance with a shallow groove at the midline. This groove is the basilar sulcus and is covered by the basilar artery. The basilar artery feeds into the circle of Willis providing blood supply to the brainstem and cerebellum. The ridged appearance is due to the fibers that come out of the pons to enter the cerebellum. The basilar pons contains fibers from the corticospinal tract (a descending pathway for neurons to reach other structures in the body), pontine nuclei, and transverse pontine fibers. The corticospinal tract carries fibres from the primary motor cortex to the spinal cord, aiding in voluntary motor movement of the body. In addition to passing through the ventral pons, corticospinal tract fibers go through other structures of the brainstem, including the internal capsule and the crus cerebri.

Integral to the basilar pons are the pontine nuclei. The pontine nuclei are responsible for projecting fibers that go to the opposite cerebellar hemisphere through the middle cerebellar peduncle, changing the fibers into transverse pontine fibers. The fibers of the pontine nuclei are all important to motor function, including fiber bundles such as the corticospinal fibers and corticopontine-pontocerebellar system. Specifically, the basilar part of the pons contains all the corticofugal fibers, which include the corticospinal, corticobulbar (or corticonuclear), and corticopontine fibers. The basal pontine nuclei provides most of the cortical information to the cerebellum received from the corticopontine fibers.

== Clinical significance ==
Tissue death (infarction), in this region can impair motor functioning. A lacunar stroke of the base of the pons is known to cause contralateral dysarthria-clumsy hand syndrome.

The basilar pons undergoes demyelination in the condition known as central pontine myelinolysis. This disorder is due to the rapid intravenous correction of hyponatremia.
