= Pontine nuclei =

Parts of the mammalian brain

- Cross section through the lower pons showing the pontine nuclei (#22) and the pontocerebellar fibers emerging from them to become the middle cerebellar peduncle

Details

Identifiers
- Latin: nuclei pontis
- NeuroNames: 617
- NeuroLex ID: birnlex_1516
- TA98: A14.1.05.202
- TA2: 5926
- FMA: 72512

The pontine nuclei (or griseum pontis) are all the neurons of the ventral pons. Corticopontine fibres project from the primary motor cortex to the ipsilateral pontine nucleus; pontocerebellar fibers then relay the information to the contralateral cerebellum via the middle cerebellar peduncle.

They are involved in motor function: the pontine nuclei are involved in adjusting movements according to their outcome (movement error correction), and are therefore important in learning motor skills.

== Anatomy ==
The pontine nuclei encompass all of the about 20 million neurons scattered throughout the basilar part of pons. The pontine nuclei nuclei extend caudally into the medulla oblongata as the arcuate nucleus which is functionally homologous with the pontine nuclei.

=== Afferents ===
Corticopontine fibres arise primarily from the neocortex layer V of the premotor, somatosensory, non-striate visual, posterior parietal, and cingulate cerebral cortex; there are also a few fibers originating from the prefrontal, temporal, and striate cortex.

Pontine nuclei also receive afferents from the lateral geniculate nucleus, superior colliculus, pretectal nuclei, hypothalamus, medial mammillary nucleus, cerebellum trigeminal nuclei, dorsal column nuclei, locus coeruleus, periaqueductal gray, raphe nuclei, and reticular formation.

=== Efferents ===
Pontocerebellar fibers are the sole efferent pathway of the pontine nuclei. The fibers mostly decussate within the pons to pass through the (contralateral) middle cerebellar peduncle to terminate in the contralateral cerebellum as mossy fibers; they form terminal synapses in the cerebellar cortex, but also issue collaterals to the cerebellar nuclei.

== Neurophysiology ==
Likely, all of the neurons of the pontine nuclei are glutaminergic.

== See also ==
- Corticopontocerebellar tract
