= Basilar part =

Basilar part (pars basilaris) can refer to:

- Basilar part of occipital bone (pars basilaris ossis occipitalis)
- Basilar part of pons (pars basilaris pontis)
