= Pontine arteries =

- Diagram of the arterial circulation at the base of the brain. (Pontine labeled at center left.)

Details
- Source: Basilar artery
- Supplies: Pons

Identifiers
- Latin: arteriae ad pontem
- TA98: A12.2.08.021
- TA2: 4559
- FMA: 70796

The pontine arteries are a number of small arteries which come off at right angles from either side of the basilar artery and supply the pons and adjacent parts of the brain. The pontine arteries include the paramedian arteries, the short circumferential, and the long circumferential arteries. (Note: Refer to diagram.)

== See also ==
- Superior cerebellar artery

== Additional images ==
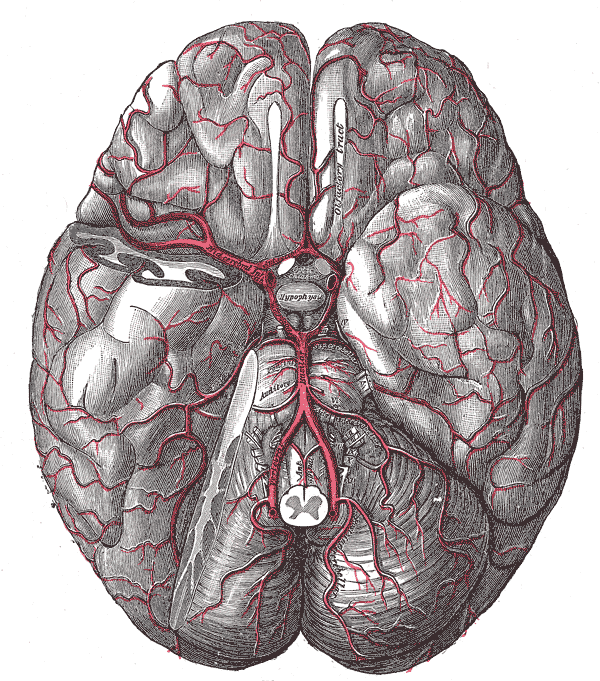
The arteries of the base of the brain.

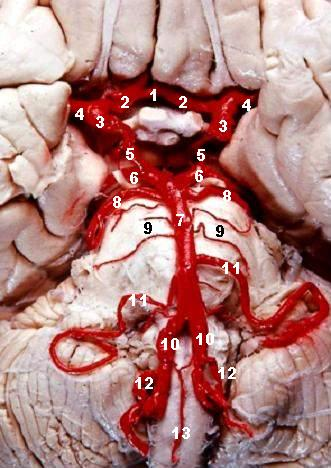
Human brainstem blood supply
