= Anterior lobe of cerebellum =

- Superior view of an cerebellum. Anterior lobe shown in red.

- The anterior lobe is demarcated by the primary fissure from the posterior lobe .

Details

Identifiers
- Latin: lobus anterior cerebelli
- NeuroNames: 650
- NeuroLex ID: birnlex_1118
- TA98: A14.1.07.102
- TA2: 5793
- FMA: 72251

The anterior lobe of cerebellum is one of the lobes of the cerebellum responsible for mediating unconscious proprioception. Inputs into the anterior lobe of the cerebellum are mainly from the spinal cord. It is sometimes equated to the "paleocerebellum".

== Clinical significance ==
=== Anterior lobe syndrome ===
When a person gets most of their calories from alcohol (chronic alcoholism) the anterior lobe can deteriorate due to malnutrition. This is known as anterior lobe syndrome, and it causes unsteady gait.

== Additional images ==
Animation. Anterior lobe shown in red.

Close up animation. Anterior lobe shown in red.

Dissection video (1 min 20 s). Demonstrating the three cerebellar lobes.
