= Cognitive neuroscience of dreams =

Field of research

Scholarly interest in the process and functions of dreaming has been present since Sigmund Freud's interpretations in the 1900s. The neurology of dreaming has remained misunderstood until recent distinctions, however. The information available via modern techniques of brain imaging has provided new bases for the study of the dreaming brain. The bounds that such technology has afforded has created an understanding of dreaming that seems ever-changing; even now questions still remain as to the function and content of dreams.

Preliminary observations into the neurology of dreaming were reported in 1951 by George Humphrey and Oliver Zangwill. Their report noted two cases of brain injury that resulted in the complete or almost complete cessation of dreaming. Both patients had undergone damage to posterior parietal regions, one of which involved predominately the left side of the parieto-occipital areas. Additional effects involved hemianopia, reduced visualization (in waking state), and disturbances in visual memory. Patients reported that their visual images were dim and hard to evoke. Although they reported only two cases, Humphrey and Zangwill offered preliminary ideas about neurological components of dreaming, specifically the association of forebrain areas and the link between visual imaging and the ability to dream.

== Methodological issues in scientific dream studies ==
There are several difficulties encountered while studying subjective experiences like dreaming. Methodologies in dream studies are abound with conceptual complexities and limitations.

=== Reliance on verbal reports ===
One significant shortcoming of dream studies is the necessary reliance on verbal reports. The dream event is reduced to a verbal report which is only an account of the subject's memory of the dream, not the subject's experience of the dream itself. These verbal reports are also at risk of being influenced by a number of factors. First, dreams involve multiple pseudo-sensory, emotional and motoric elements. The dream report is only narrative, which makes capturing the whole picture difficult. Verbal reports face other difficulties like forgetting. Dreams and reports of dreams are produced in distinct states of consciousness resulting in a delay between the dream event and its recall while awake. During this time lag forgetting may occur resulting in an incomplete report. Forgetting is proportional to the amount of time elapsed between the experience and its recall. Also, remembering is exposed to interference at the recall stage and some information is not accessible to recall. Reconstructing the dream from memory while awake might affect the accuracy of recall because the subject may report more information than actually experienced, and sequence of events may be reordered. Another issue is the difficulty of verbally describing mostly visual subjective experiences like those found in dreams (e.g. unreal objects, bizarre experiences, emotions). Furthermore, subjects may intentionally fail to report embarrassing, immoral, or private dream experiences for fear of judgement, which results in censored, incomplete reports.

=== The sleep laboratory environment ===
The sleep laboratory environment is another major source of methodological issues. Sleep laboratories are an unnatural, awkward environment for sleeping. The subject may feel discomfort and anxiety, which may make sleep more difficult and of inferior quality. This is the well-known first night effect. Complete adaptation to the sleep laboratory may take four days or longer, which is longer than the duration of most laboratory studies. Also, the content of dreams at the laboratory has been observed to be different from dreams at home. Similarly, the laboratory environment may alter the content of dreams recalled from spontaneous awakenings at the end of a night's sleep, as indicated by high frequency of laboratory references in morning spontaneous awakenings in REM and NREM dream reports.

=== Statistical concerns ===
Statistical concerns in dream studies are another cause of methodological issues. Many investigators used small samples for sleep studies and statistical parametric mapping (a technique for examining differences in brain activity recorded during functional neuroimaging experiments). Results obtained from small samples must be interpreted with caution due to inherent statistical problems associated with small samples.

=== Technological limitations ===
Technological limitations also pose methodological problems. Measures of global brain activity like electroencephalogram (EEG) voltage averaging or cerebral blood flow cannot identify small but influential neuronal populations like the locus coeruleus, the raphe nucleus and the pedunculopontine tegmental nucleus, which reveal mechanistic and functional details in dreaming. Despite these shortcomings, it is widely agreed that clinical findings and data obtained from neuro-imaging are valid, affirming neuro-imaging as an essential tool in cognitive neuroscience.

=== Lesion and activation interpretations ===
Brain-damaged patients offer valuable but rare information about human brain mechanisms. Eugene Aserinsky and Nathaniel Kleitman observed REM sleep and concluded that it was the physiological manifestation of dreaming. This was assumed to be a breakthrough in the understanding of such an elusive process as dreaming. Indeed, 95% of subjects awakened during REM reported that they had been dreaming whereas only about 5-10% reported dreams after being awakened during non-REM sleep (NREM).

== REM and NREM dream reports compared ==
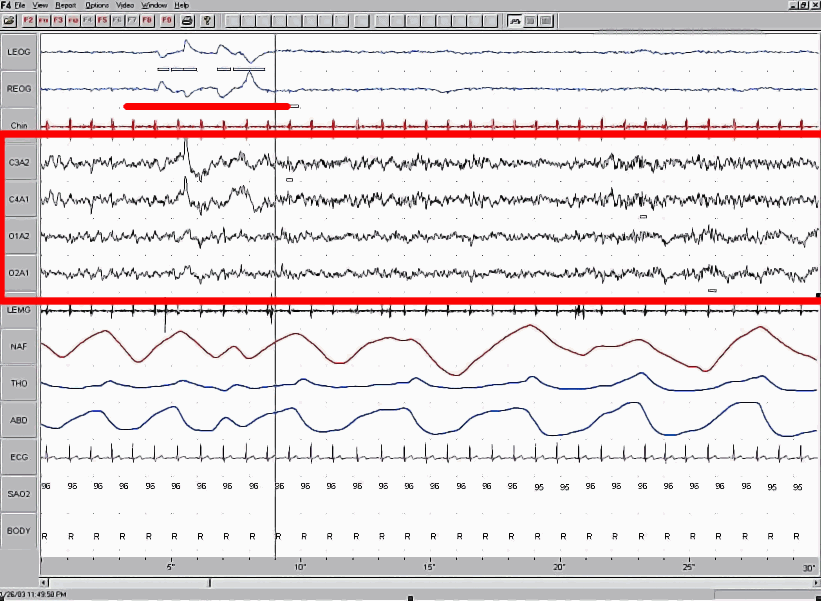
The REM portion of sleep is outlined in red

There are several important differences between REM and NREM dream reports. There is disagreement amongst experts about the existence of qualitative differences, but there is a general consensus that there are quantitative differences.

It has been recognized that following REM awakenings dream reports are obtained substantially more frequently than after NREM awakenings. Subjects dream reports are related to the length of REM sleep. Word count and subjectively estimated dream duration increase as length of preceding REM sleep increases, revealing a positive relationship. Reports from REM awakenings tend to be longer, more multimodal perceptually, have intensified emotionality, and are less reminiscent of waking life than NREM awakenings. Judges are able to differentiate unaltered REM and NREM dream reports, while some subjects are able to discern whether they themselves had been awakened from REM or NREM.

The characteristics of REM sleep consistently contain a similar set of features. While dreaming, people regularly falsely believe that they are awake unless they implement lucidity. Dreams contain multimodal pseudo-perceptions; sometimes any or all sensory modalities are present, but most often visual and motoric. Dream imagery can change quickly and is regularly of a bizarre nature, but reports also contain many images and events that are a part of day-to-day life. In dreams there is a reduction or absence of self-reflection or other forms of meta-cognition relative to during waking life. Dreams are also characterized by a lack of "orientational stability; persons, times, and places are fused, plastic, incongruous and discontinuous". In addition, dreams form a single narrative to explain and integrate all dream elements. Lastly, NREM reports contain thought-like mentation and depictions of current concerns more frequently than REM reports.

== Neuroanatomy of dreaming ==
=== REM sleep and dreaming ===
Aserinsky and Kleitman's discovery prompted further research into the brain mechanism involved in REM sleep (and by their assumption, dreaming). It was found that REM is generated by a small region of cells located in the brain stem called the pons (it sits slightly above the spinal cord at the nape of the neck). The pons releases acetylcholine which travels to parts of the forebrain. Cholinergic activation of these higher areas was thought to result in the meaningless images that make up our dreams. This process is switched off by noradrenaline and serotonin which are also released by the brain stem.

The formation of the activation–synthesis model put forth by Allan Hobson and McCarley in 1975 rested largely on these discoveries. Their model posits that dreams are actively generated by the brain stem and then passively synthesized by the forebrain. That is, the cholinergic activation that occurs in any forebrain areas (via transmission from brain stem) results in attempts by the brain's cognitive areas to enforce sense or structure onto meaningless activation. Dreaming and REM sleep are controlled by different brain mechanisms. Cerebral areas were not thought to play any sort of causal role because REM sleep occurs as long as the pons is intact, even if higher areas are disconnected or removed; an inference based on the assumption that REM sleep is dreaming.

=== A shift to NREM ===
Although this assumption has remained a predominant view, disputing evidence has been present since the 60s. Foulkes for example reported that complex mentation is indeed possible during NREM. Previously participants reported dreams mainly after being awakened from REM, however upon awakening during NREM Foulkes asked subjects about what had just been passing through their heads, rather than whether or not they were dreaming. As many as 50% of subjects reported some form of complex mentation. Furthermore, these NREM dreams seemed to cluster around specific sleep stages (stage 1 and late stages). This offered evidence that dreaming was not restricted nor caused by mechanisms controlling REM sleep, and that perhaps there are entirely different brain areas associated with dreaming.

An investigation of the differential brain structures can be conducted by clinico-anatomical correlations. Here, the mechanisms associated with REM sleep are removed to observe whether there is a cessation in dreaming as well, then the areas thought to be associated with dreaming are removed to see if REM sleep is also made impossible. These studies, with the exception of natural accidents, are conducted with animals. A main problem with obliterating REM sleep is that the associated area, the brain stem, is responsible for consciousness. Lesions large enough to stop REM completely can also render the subject unconscious. Supporting evidence did come from the flip-side of clinico-anatomical correlations however. In a compilation of all reported cases of dream cessation (111 cases in all) damage was located in an entirely different area of the brain than the brain stem. Furthermore, REM sleep was maintained. Remember that the pons is crucial for REM. Loss of dreaming only occurred when higher parts of the cerebral hemispheres were damaged. REM sleep is controlled by cholinergic activation in the pons. It is now believed that dreaming may be a dopaminergic process that occurs in limbic and frontal areas of the brain.

=== Dopaminergic activation ===
Two main frontal areas have been implicated in the dream process. The first involves the deep white matter of the frontal lobes (just above the eyes). The main systems at work here involve the mesolimbic and mesocortical dopaminergic pathways. There are connecting fibres that run between frontal and limbic structures. A dopaminergic pathway runs from the ventral tegmental area, ascends through the lateral hypothalamus, various basal forebrain areas (nucleus basalis, stria terminalis, shell of nucleus accumbens) and terminates in the amygdala, anterior cingulate gyrus and frontal cortex. Damage to the dopaminergic pathway results in a loss of dreaming. Furthermore, chemical stimulation of the pathway (with L-DOPA for example) increases the frequency and vividness of dreams without affecting REM sleep. The mesolimbic and mesocortical pathways are considered the seeking areas or the motivational command centers of the brain. Damage not only results in the loss of dreams but also of motivated behaviour. More recent studies suggest that the mesocorticolimbic dopaminergic system is explicitly linked to the content experienced within dreams. The roles of the reward system in sleep and dreaming. Neuroscience & Biobehavioral Reviews Mesolimbic Dopaminergic (ML-DA) reward system during sleep is critical for the generation and motivational content of dreams. Since mesocortical and mesolimbic pathways are highly active during REM sleep, neuroimaging data advocates for the theory that dreams are driven by deep -rooted biological motivations rather than just being considered as random noise. Transection or inhibition of the dopamine pathway also reduces some positive symptoms of schizophrenia, many of which have been likened to dream-like states. Drugs that block the system have anti-psychotic effects but also reduce excessive and vivid dreaming. Further evidence that dreaming can occur independently of REM sleep is found in the occurrence of nocturnal seizures during NREM that often present themselves as nightmares. Activation here is seen in the temporal lobe, again a forebrain area.

The evidence of the involvement of mesolimbic and mesocortical dopaminergic pathways suggests that dreaming occurs when a motivational component is activated. Only when this pathway is removed do dreams cease to occur. This system can be activated by mechanisms of REM sleep but can also occur independently during NREM stages of sleep.

=== Perceptual processing ===
Another area thought to be involved in the generation of dreams is the Parieto-Occipito-Temporal junction (PTO). This is an area of grey cortex towards the back of the brain involved in the highest levels of perceptual processing. It is here that perceptions are converted into abstract thoughts and memories. The PTO is also vital for mental imagery. Damage specifically to this area results in complete loss of dreaming, however damage to lower levels of perceptual processing merely results in reduced aspects of dream imagery. This is the basis for the suggestion that dreaming involves a reversed sequence of perceptual events. Instead of bottom-up it is top-down (higher levels activating lower levels instead lower to higher). Activation of the motivational mechanisms in the brain would normally be directed toward goal-oriented actions. However, during sleep access to the motor system is blocked (by inactivation of the dorsolateral frontal convexity). As a result, activation moves backwards toward the perceptual areas. This is why the dreamer doesn't engage in motivated behaviours but imagines them. Furthermore, there is inactivation of the reflective system in the limbic brain which leads the dreamer to mistake the dream for reality. Damage to this area also results in the inability to distinguish dreams from reality during waking state.
