= Primary fissure of cerebellum =

Groove in the top of the cerebellum

- Upper surface of the cerebellum. (Preclival fissure coloured in red.)

- The primary fissure demarcates the anterior lobe and the posterior lobe .

Details

Identifiers
- Latin: fissura prima
- NeuroNames: 648
- TA98: A14.1.07.119
- TA2: 5794
- FMA: 83729

The monticulus of the cerebellum is divided by the primary fissure (or preclival fissure) into an anterior, raised part, the culmen or summit, and a posterior sloped part, the clivus; the quadrangular lobule is similarly divided.

== Additional images ==
Animation. Primary fissure shown in red.

Close up animation. Primary fissure shown in red.

Dissection video (1 min 20 s). Demonstrating the three cerebellar lobes. "V-shaped fissure" is the primary fissure.

== See also ==
- Anatomy of the cerebellum
