= Costanzo Varolio =

Italian anatomist and physician

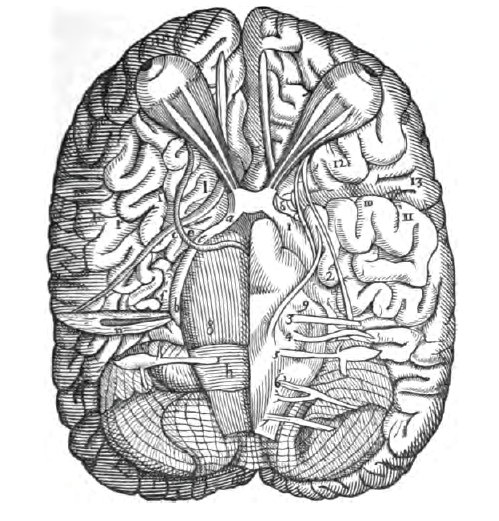
- Illustration from De Nervis Opticis by Varolius
- Born: Constantius Varolius; 1543; Bologna
- Died: 1575 (aged 31 - 32)
- Occupations: Anatomist and papal physician
- Known for: Work on the cranial nerves
- Medical career
- Institutions: Sapienza University of Rome
- Research: Erectile function

Costanzo Varolio, Latinized as Constantius Varolius (1543–1575) was an Italian anatomist and a papal physician to Gregory XIII.

Varolio was born in Bologna. He was a pupil of the anatomist Giulio Cesare Aranzio, himself a pupil of Vesalius. He received his doctorate in medicine in 1567. In 1569 the Senate of the University of Bologna created an extraordinary chair in surgery for him with responsibility to teach anatomy as well and where a statue of him is housed at the Anatomical Theatre of the Archiginnasio. Later he is believed to have taught at the Sapienza University of Rome although he is not listed on the roll there. Nevertheless, he is known to have had considerable success in Rome both as a physician and as a surgeon and his memorial plaque in that city refers to his great skill in removing stones. He putatively was a physician to Pope Gregory XIII, and died in Rome, where he was buried in San Marcello al Corso.

He is best remembered for his work on the cranial nerves. He was the first to examine the brain from its base upwards, in contrast with previous dissections which had been performed from the top downwards. In 1573 he published this new method of dissecting the brain whereby he separated the brain from the skull and began the dissection from the base. Varolio described many of the brain's structures for the first time including the pons or pons Varolii which is a reflex center of respiration and a communication bridge between spinal cord and brain, the crura cerebri and the ileocecal valve.

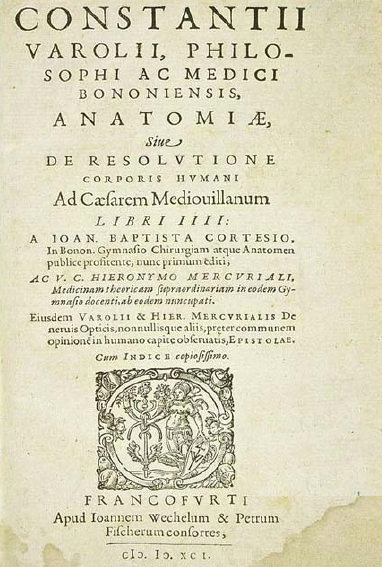
Title page to Anatomiae de corporis humani

Another area of interest to him was the mechanism of erectile function. Although the “Musculi erectores penis” (i.e. Mm. bulbospongiosi and ischiocavernosi) had already been described by Galen in the 2nd century A.D., this knowledge was lost by the time of Varolio, who re-discovered them and gave a surprisingly accurate description of the mechanism of erection although his inaccurate attribution of erection to "erector muscles" continued to be believed by most anatomists for three centuries.

Varolius' work is the following:
De Nervis Opticis nonnullisque aliis praeter communem opinionem in Humano capite observatis. Ad Hieronymum Mercurialem, Patavii apud Paul et Anton. Meiettos fratres, 1573, 8º, 8 and 32 leaves. It consists of a letter to Girolamo Mercuriale, dated 1 April 1572, his answer, and Varolius' reply to the latter. Appended are three woodcuts pertaining to the brain and drawn by Varolius himself. The engraving is somewhat crude, yet distinct and instructive.

A second work by Varolius, a teleologic physiology of man, was published for the first time after his death: Anatomiae sive de resolutione corporis humani ad Caesarem Mediovillanum libri iv, Eiusdem Varolii et Hieron. Mercrialis De nervis Opticis, etc. epistolae, Francofurti, apud Joh. Wechelum et Petr. Fischerum consortes, 1591, 8º, 8 and 184 pp. This contains one illustration. The former book is republished as a part of this work with unchanged text and the woodcuts recarved in a somewhat different manner.
