= Inferior petrosal sulcus =

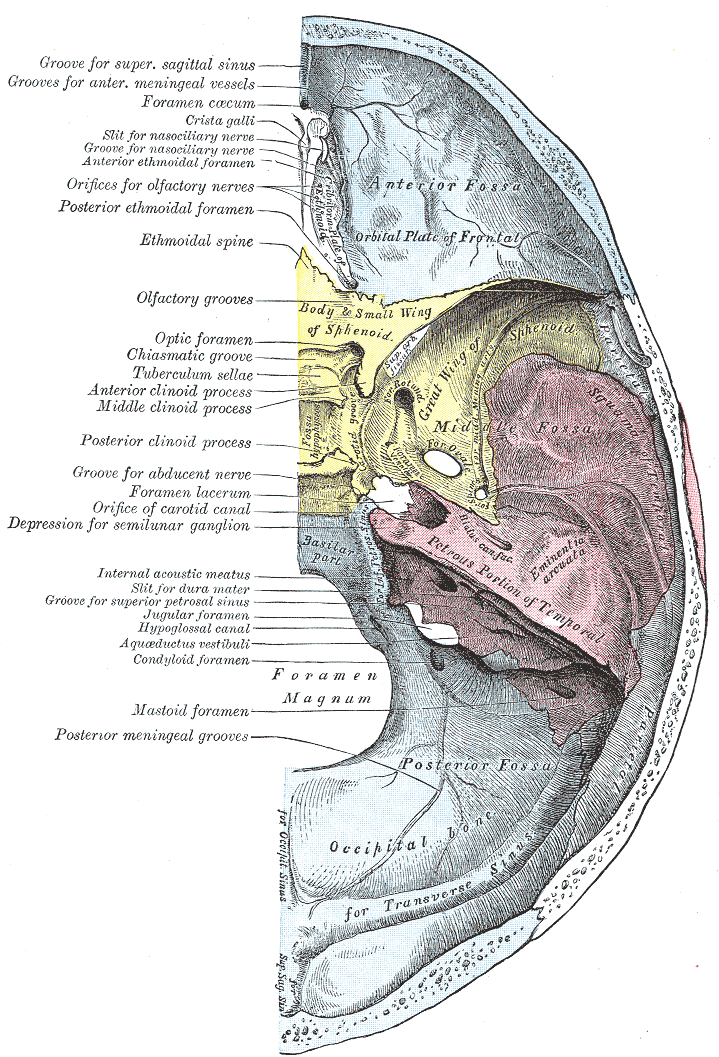

The inferior petrosal sulcus is the groove containing the inferior petrosal sinus.

The inferior petrosal sulcus is formed by the junction of the petrous part of the temporal bone of the skull with the basilar part of the occipital bone. It begins in the postero-inferior part of the cavernous sinus, and, passing through the anterior part of the jugular foramen, ends in the superior bulb of the internal jugular vein. The inferior petrosal sinus receives the internal auditory veins and also veins from the medulla oblongata, pons, and under surface of the cerebellum.

The exact relation of the parts to one another in the jugular foramen is as follows: the inferior petrosal sinus lies medially and anteriorly with the meningeal branch of the ascending pharyngeal artery, and is directed obliquely downward and backward; the transverse sinus is situated at the lateral and back part of the foramen with a meningeal branch of the occipital artery, and between the two sinuses are the glossopharyngeal, vagus, and accessory nerves. These three sets of structures are divided from each other by two processes of fibrous tissue. The junction of the inferior petrosal sinus with the internal jugular vein takes place on the lateral aspect of the nerves.

== See also ==
- Dural venous sinuses
