= Internal auditory veins =

Veins of the ear

Details
- Drains to: Inferior petrosal sinus, transverse sinuses
- Artery: Internal auditory artery

Identifiers
- Latin: venae labyrinthi
- FMA: 52386

The veins of the vestibule and semicircular canals accompany the arteries, and, receiving those of the cochlea at the base of the modiolus, unite to form the internal auditory veins (or veins of labyrinth) which end in the posterior part of the superior petrosal sinus or in the transverse sinus.
