= Corticopontine fibers =

Projections from the cerebral cortex to the pontine nuclei

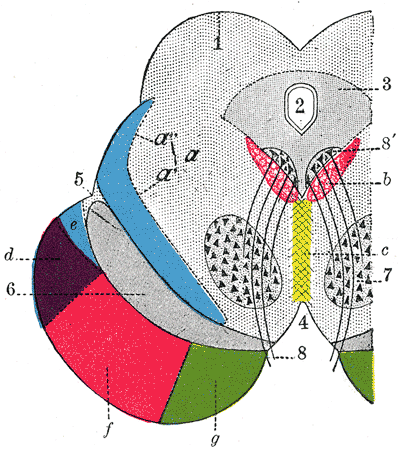
- Coronal section through mid-brain.: 1. Corpora quadrigemina.; 2. Cerebral aqueduct.; 3. Central gray stratum.; 4. Interpeduncular space.; 5. Sulcus lateralis.; 6. Substantia nigra.; 7. Red nucleus of tegmentum.; 8. Oculomotor nerve, with 8’, its nucleus of origin. a. Lemniscus (in blue) with a’ the medial lemniscus and a" the lateral lemniscus. b. Medial longitudinal fasciculus. c. Raphé. d. Temporopontine fibers. e. Portion of medial lemniscus, which runs to the lentiform nucleus and insula. f. Cerebrospinal fibers. g. Frontopontine fibers.

Details

Identifiers
- Latin: fibrae corticopontinae, tractus corticopontinus
- NeuroNames: 1322
- TA98: A14.1.05.107
- TA2: 5619
- FMA: 75190

Corticopontine fibers are projections from layer V of the cerebral cortex to the pontine nuclei of the ventral pons. They represent the first link in a cortico-cerebello-cortical pathway mediating neocerebellar control of the motor cortex. The pathway is especially important for voluntary movements.

Depending upon the lobe of origin, they can be classified as frontopontine fibers, parietopontine fibers, temporopontine fibers or occipitopontine fibers. Fibers from the frontal lobe and the parietal lobe are more numerous.

== Anatomy ==
=== Origin ===
All corticopontine fibers arise from pyramidal neurons in layer V of the cerebral cortex. They include fibers of the premotor, somatosensory, extrastriate, posterior parietal, and cingulate cortices; there are also a few fibers originating from the prefrontal, temporal, and striate cortex.

The corticopontine system contains a number of fibers from different areas of the cortex, and are far more numerous in total than the corticospinal fibers. Corticopontine fibers include:

- Frontopontine fibers that arise from the frontal lobe and are found in the medial third of the crus cerebri
- Parietopontine fibers that arise from the parietal lobe and found in the lateral part of the crus cerebri
- Occipitopontine fibers that arise from the occipital lobe and found in the lateral part of the crus cerebri
- Temporopontine fibers arising from the temporal lobe are also found in the lateral part of the cerebral crus

=== Course ===
All the fibers from the corticopontine system terminate in the pontine nuclei. The fibers descend through the sublenticular and retrolenticular of internal capsule, then traverse the midbrain through the basis pedunculi (i.e. ventral part of cerebral peduncle) to reach the pontine nuclei and synapse with neurons that give rise to pontocerebellar fibers.

As the corticopontine fibres descend in the cerebral peduncle, those from the prefrontal regions are situated most medially; those from premotor and motor cortices are situated in the middle third of the peduncle, and fibers from the parietal, temporal and occipital regions that travel to the pons are in the lateral third of the cerebral peduncle.

Two fiber bundles, an anterior and a posterior bundle relate the cortex to the cerebellum. The anterior bundle, is of frontopontine fibers, particularly from Brodmann areas 4 and 6 and is known as Arnold's bundle. The posterior bundle is of the corticopontine fibers comprising the parietopontine, temporopontine, and occipitopontine fibers, and is known as Türck's bundle.
