= Lipohyalinosis =

Lipohyalinosis is a cerebral small vessel disease affecting the small arteries, arterioles or capillaries in the brain. Originally defined by C. Miller Fisher as 'segmental arteriolar wall disorganisation', it is characterized by vessel wall thickening and a resultant reduction in luminal diameter. Fisher considered this small vessel disease to be the result of hypertension, induced in the acute stage by fibrinoid necrosis that would lead to occlusion and hence lacunar stroke. However, recent evidence suggests that endothelial dysfunction as a result of inflammation is a more likely cause for it. This may occur subsequent to blood–brain barrier failure, and lead to extravasation of serum components into the brain that are potentially toxic. Lacunar infarction could thus occur in this way, and the narrowing – the hallmark feature of lipohyalinosis – may merely be a feature of the swelling occurring around it that squeezes on the structure.

== Misuse of the term ==
C. Miller Fisher had decided to make lipohyalinosis a substitute term for fibrinoid necrosis. Fisher had done this because "of what he perceived to be the general agreement that the affected arteriolar segments also contained lipid". This has caused some issues with the usage of the term lipohyalinosis. "Because of its use by some earlier authors, Fisher included "hyalinosis" in the list of synonyms that also included the term "fibrinoid"". This means that people often associate hyalinosis and hyaline with lipohyalinosis and consider them the same thing. The misuse of the term lipohyalinosis also has meant that many cerebral vessel pathology have been incorrectly described as lipohyalinosis. This misuse of lipohyalinosis may cause issues for accurate diagnosis and therefore treatment of specific conditions if used incorrectly on a patient.

== Hypertension ==
Hypertension is a strong risk factor. So-called deep-perforating arteries – relatively small arteries branching off of relatively large arteries (most commonly the lenticulostriate arteries from the middle cerebral artery) – are especially prone. Uncontrolled hypertension and diabetes are both risk factors for this condition.

When Fisher observed the relationship between lacunar infarcts and lipohyalinosis, he also noted the relation to hypertension. It has been found that "The strong association between lipohyalinosis and hypertension documented by Fisher has been confirmed in several studies". These studies have shown hypertension can cause lipohyalinosis because of the way hypertension changes blood vessels' structure. "Vascular remodelling of small and large vessels provoked by arterial hypertension is the initial step in the development of atherosclerosis and lipohyalinosis." More specifically, "Hypertension alters the structure of blood vessels by producing vascular hypertrophy and remodeling and by promoting atherosclerosis in large cerebral arteries and lipohyalinosis in penetrating arterioles". Chronic hypertension even produces arteriolar changes like lipohyalinosis that makes the blood vessel very susceptible to rupture. The relationship between lipohyalinosis and hypertension is well documented and confirmed by various studies.

Furthermore, "In the microscopic level of small arteries or arterioles, hypertension also generates specific vasculopathies such as lipohyalinosis and thus causing lacunar infarctions". Hypertensions and lacunar infarcts and lacunar stroke are related. This means hypertension is a start to a chain reaction. From lipohyalinosis to lacunar infarctions that may eventually lead to stroke, hypertension, uncontrolled, can cause a lot of damage to the brain.

== Lacunar infarcts ==
Lacunar infarcts are a result of atherosclerosis (microthrombi) and lipohyalinosis. These affect the deep structures of the brain and may leave small (~5mm) cavity lesions. Small lacunar infarcts are "caused by various arterial disorders, the most frequent of which include microatheroma, lipohyalinosis, fibrinoid necrosis, and Charcot-Bouchard aneurysm".

Lipohyalinosis was considered the most common cause for lacunar infarcts. Fisher observed through autopsy studies that lacunar infarcts are caused by processes he described as segmental arterial disorganization, fibrinoid degeneration, and lipohyalinosis. Fisher's work in this area has been invaluable, but in more recent research into this area with new technology has brought up questions if lipohyalinosis is really the main cause of lacunar infarcts or lacunar stroke. Some new research now suggests that microatheroma may now be considered the main cause in that it is "now thought to be the most common mechanism of small vessel occlusion..." These new findings have to be looked into more closely to determine if microatheroma is the main cause of lacunar infarcts or lacunar stroke or if Fisher's work still stands as it has for many years that lipohyalinosis is one of the main causes.

== Cognitive decline ==
In a study done in 2003, researchers had found that their "data indicate that widespread small vessel lesions due to both [cerebral amyloid angiopathy] and [arteriosclerosis/lipohyalinosis] may play a critical role in the development of [Alzheimer disease]". This means lipohyalinosis may be a huge factor in Alzheimer's disease and cognitive decline in general.

There have also been other studies that link cerebral small vessel diseases to cognitive decline and lipohyalinosis being a cerebral small vessel disease, is included in those as well. Cerebral small vessel disease is a major cause of cognitive decline in the older populations. The results from a small pilot study had found that "Participants showed some decreases in executive functioning, attention, processing speed, and memory retrieval, consistent with previous literature" and that "Performance on a computer-administered cognitive measure showed a slight overall decline over a period of 8–28 months". Cerebral small vessel disease has caused, even if it is slight, a decline in cognition and has in this study and other studies like it.

== Other ==
There are many other conditions and diseases that are related to lipohyalinosis. Below are the names of a few that are related to it and what they are.

=== Leukoaraiosis ===
Leukoaraiosis is a disease found in the brain and is very visible on CT or MRI scans. "Leukoaraiosis, or periventricular white matter disease, is the result of multiple small-vessel infarcts within the subcortical white matter... The pathophysiologic basis of the disease is lipohyalinosis of small penetrating arteries within the white matter, likely produced by chronic hypertension."

=== Chronic familial lipohyalinosis ===
Chronic familial lipohyalinosis is a rare inherited variant.
