= Middle cerebellar peduncle =

Structure in the brain connecting the pons to the cerebellum

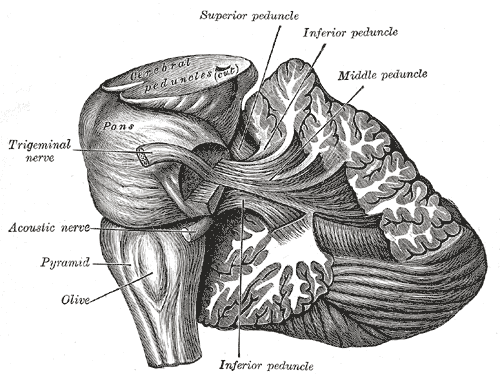
- Dissection showing the projection fibers of the cerebellum. (Middle peduncle labeled at upper right.)

Details

Identifiers
- Latin: pedunculus cerebellaris medius
- MeSH: D065837
- NeuroNames: 620
- NeuroLex ID: birnlex_1529
- TA98: A14.1.05.003; A14.1.07.416
- TA2: 5848
- FMA: 72515

The middle cerebellar peduncle (or brachium pontis) is one of three paired cerebellar peduncles connecting the brainstem to the cerebellum. The connection is from the pons. It connects the pons to the cerebellum, with fibres originating from the pontine nuclei, and travelling to the opposite cerebellar hemisphere. It is supplied by the anterior inferior cerebellar artery (AICA) and branches from the basilar artery. It conveys information from the cerebrum and the pons to the cerebellum.

== Structure ==
The middle cerebellar peduncle is the largest of the three cerebellar peduncles. It connects the pons and cerebellum. It consists almost entirely of fibers passing from the pons to the cerebellum (fibrocerebellar fibers); the fibers arise from the pontine nuclei and decussate within the pons before entering the peduncle to end in the contralateral cerebellar hemisphere.

The trigeminal nerve (CN V) arises from the lateral pons very close to the middle cerebellar peduncle.

=== Blood supply ===
The middle cerebellar peduncle is supplied by the anterior inferior cerebellar artery (AICA), as well as smaller branches from the basilar artery.

== Clinical significance ==
Infarction of the anterior inferior cerebellar artery (AICA) can damage the middle cerebellar peduncle. Diffuse intrinsic pontine glioma may spread from the pons into the middle cerebellar peduncle.

== Additional images ==
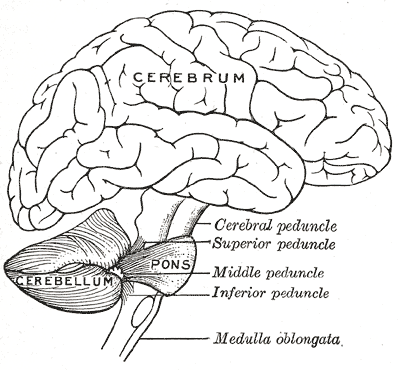
Scheme showing the connections of the several parts of the brain.

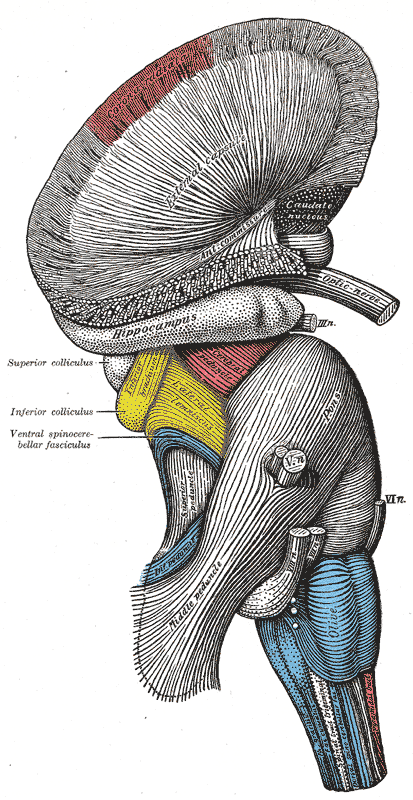
Superficial dissection of brain-stem. Lateral view.

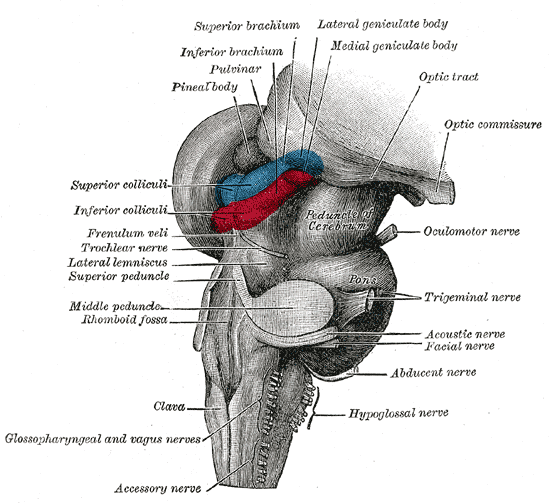
Hind- and mid-brains; postero-lateral view.

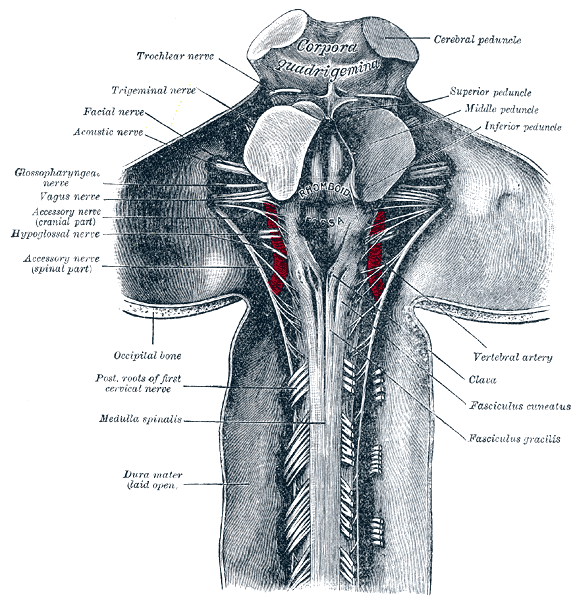
Upper part of medulla spinalis and hind- and mid-brains; posterior aspect, exposed in situ.

Basal view of a human brain

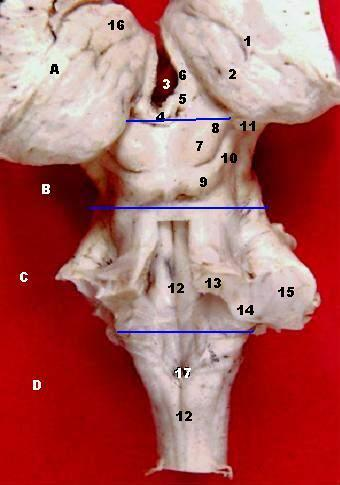
Dissection of human midbrain with middle cerebellar peduncle labeled.

Cross section through lower pons showing part of the middle cerebellar peduncle (#19) forming from the convergence of pontocerebellar fibers.

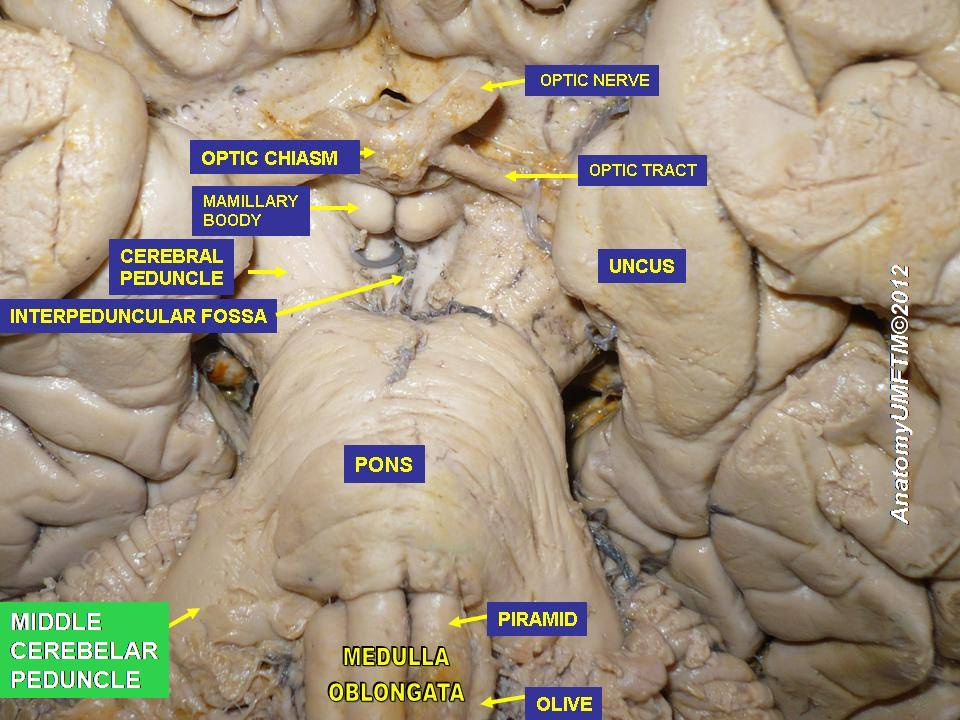
Middle cerebellar peduncle

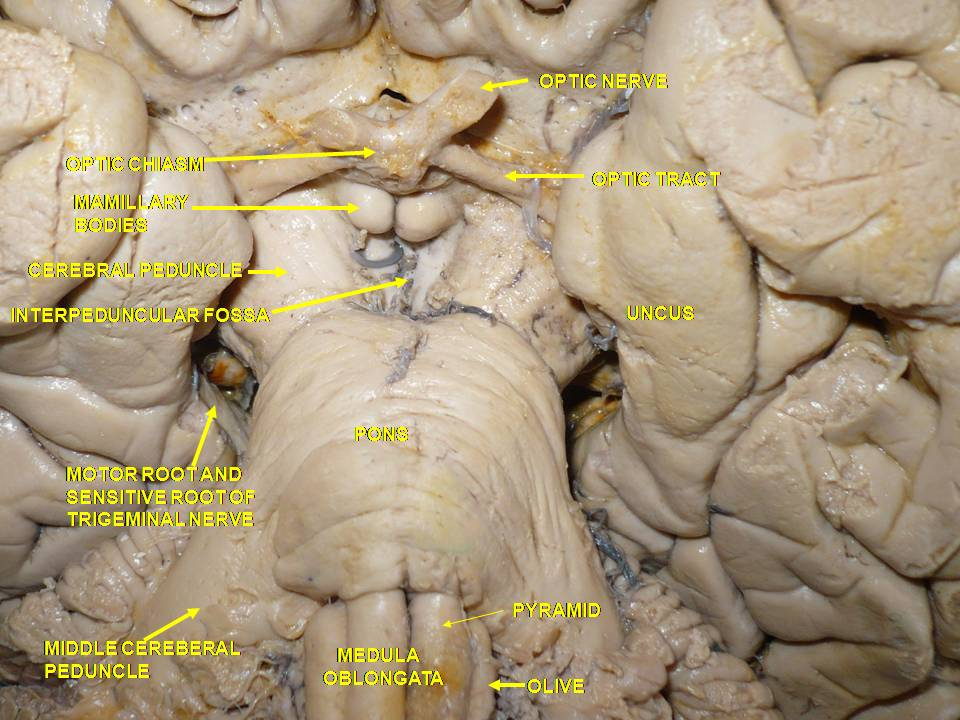
Cerebrum. Deep dissection. Inferior dissection.

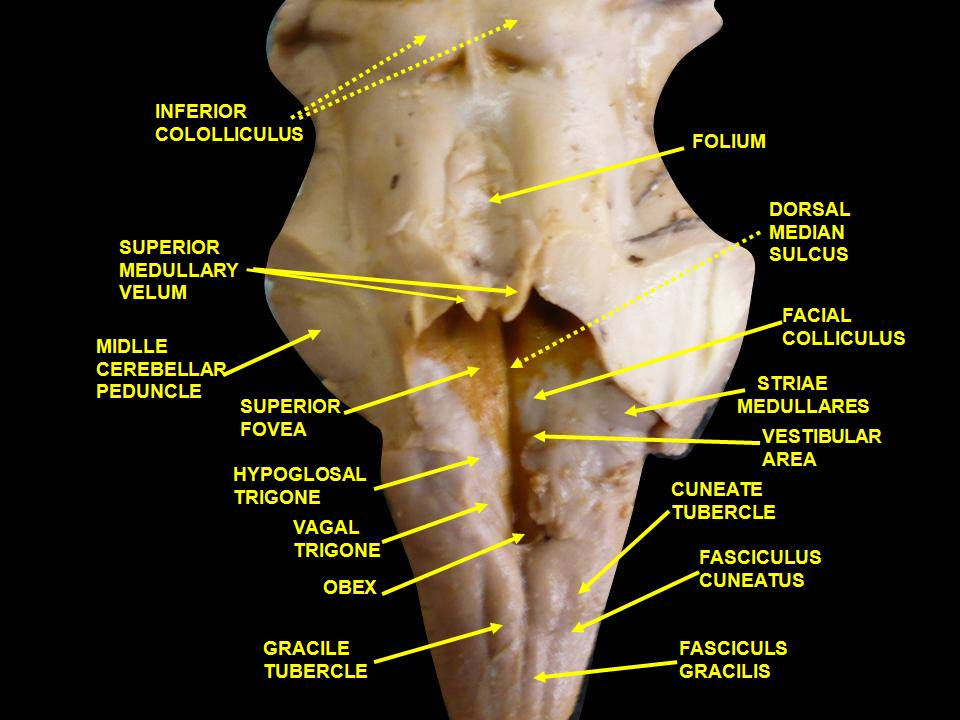
Fourth ventricle. Posterior view.Deep dissection.

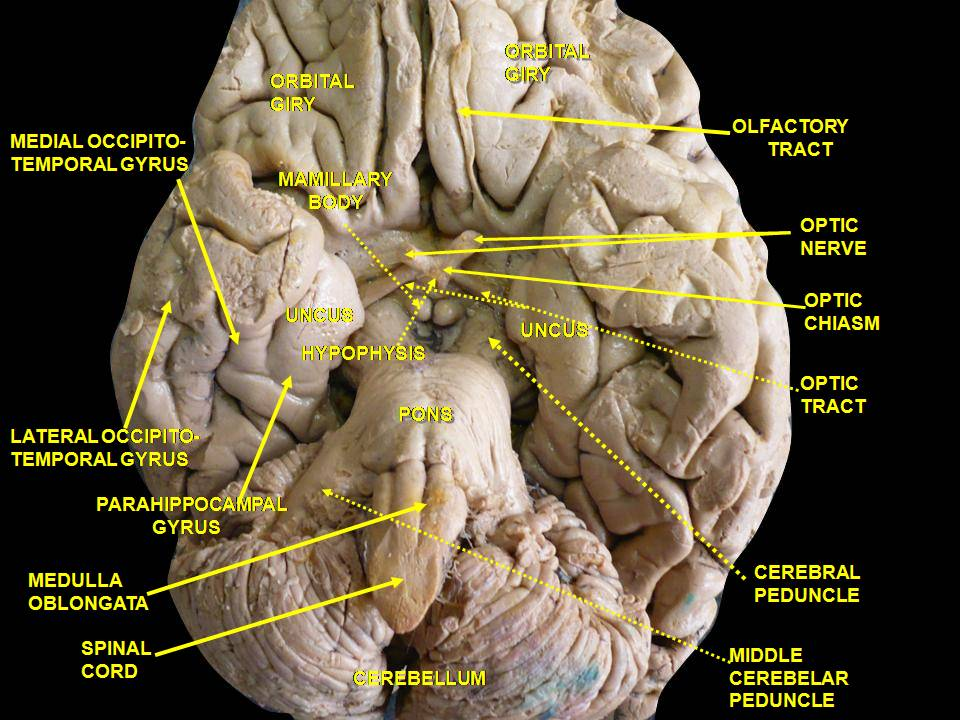
Cerebrum.Inferior view.Deep dissection.

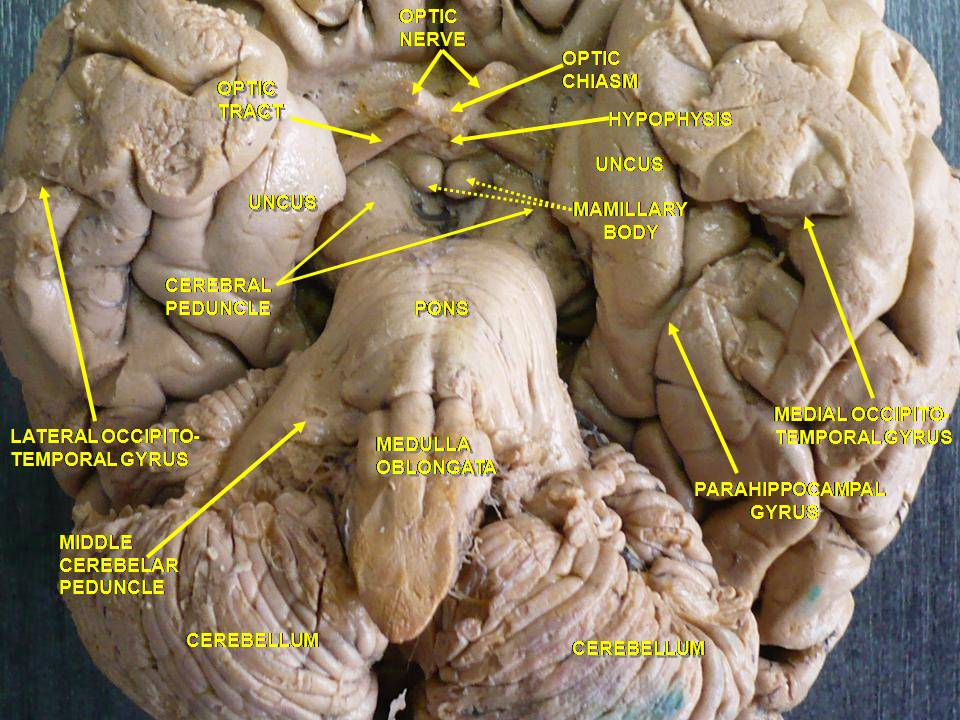
Cerebrum.Inferior view.Deep dissection.

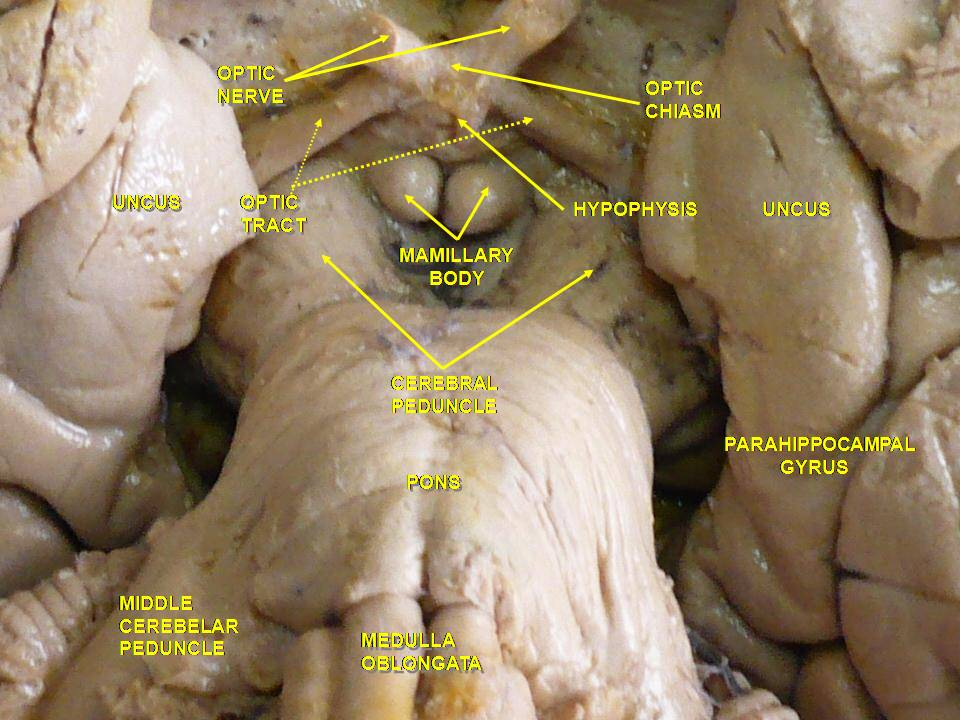
Cerebrum.Inferior view.Deep dissection.

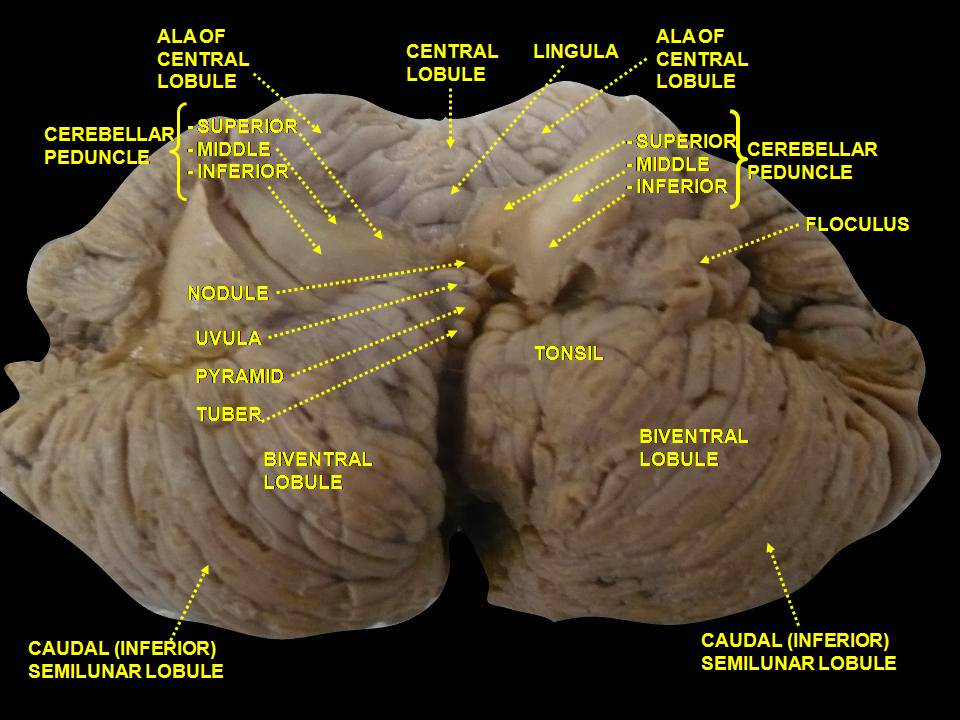
Cerebellum. Inferior surface.

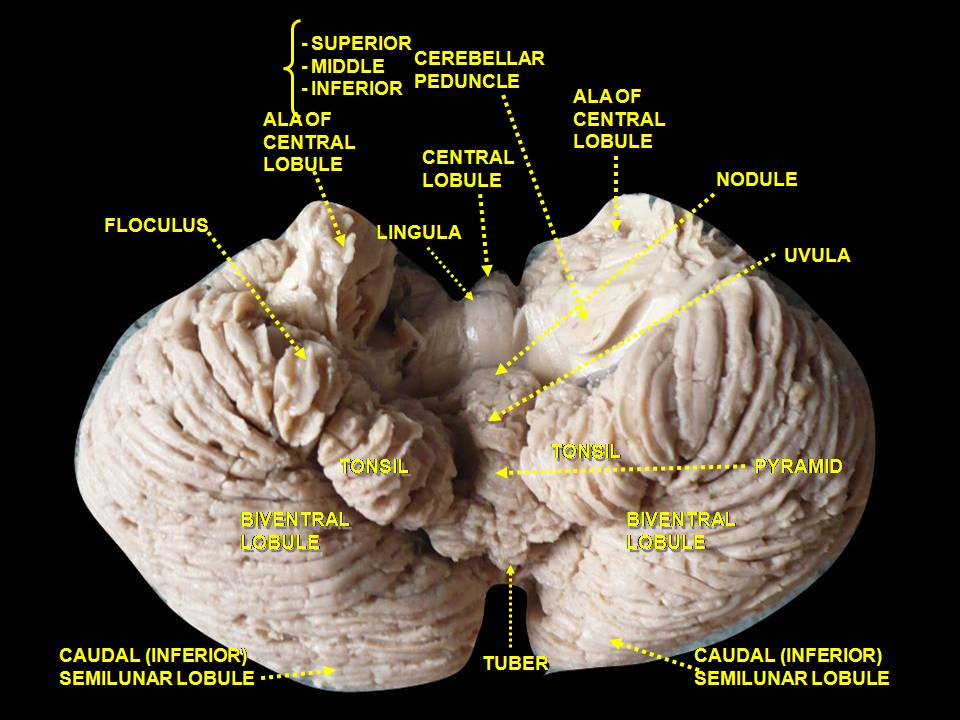
Cerebellum. Inferior surface.

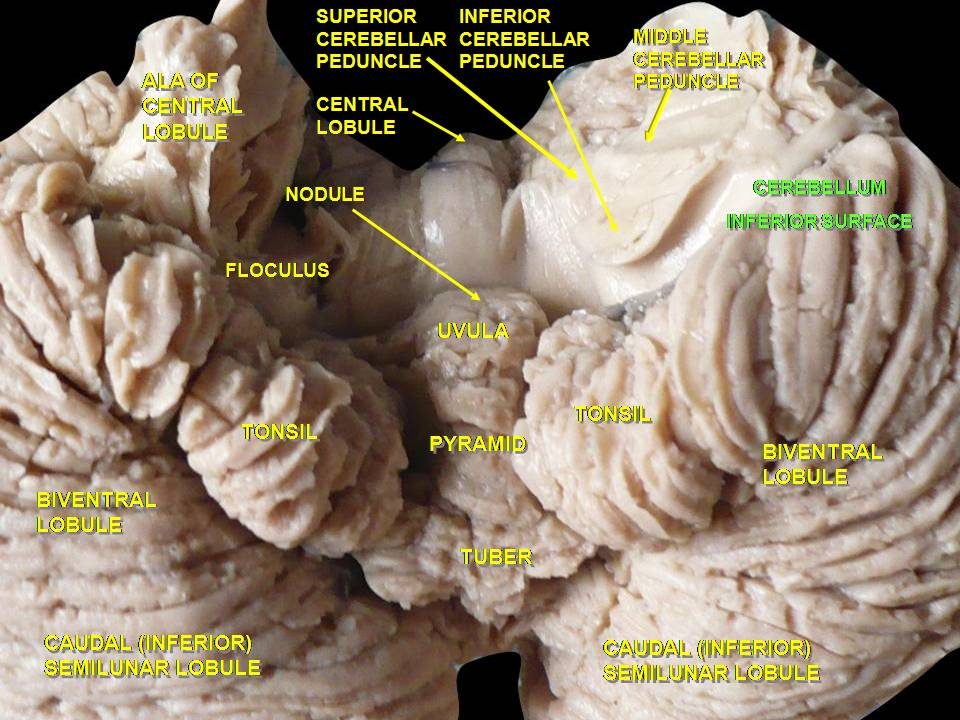
Cerebellum. Inferior surface.

== See also ==
- Superior cerebellar peduncle
- Inferior cerebellar peduncle
