= Vascular thalamic amnesia =

Vascular thalamic amnesia occurs when the thalamus is affected by Korsakoff's syndrome or damaged by lacunar infarcts or hemorrhages. Another common cause for damage to the thalamus that may contribute to the development of amnesia is a stroke. It involves a loss of memory and a shift in behaviors and attitudes that are associated with various behavioral disorders.

== Characteristics ==
In several cases, the patients who are experiencing vascular thalamic amnesia will experience declarative anterograde amnesia and cognitive and behavioral disorders. These include, but are not limited to, a disruption of verbal fluency, a lack of apathy, and dysphoria.

Some patients may also show a difficulty with constructional apraxia. This is apparent in the loss of verbal skills, particularly involving semantic and syntactic language. When this is severe it can be connected with an impairment of visual attention.

Much of the associated memory loss is dependent on the portion of the thalamus that was affected by the damage. The memory loss associated with damage to the vascular thalamus tends to maintain high variability from patient to patient. Some patients will maintain their memory while developing the behavioral disorders while others will show signs of declarative anterograde amnesia with no signs of behavioral disorders. This seems to be related to the location of the hemorrhages for each individual patient. Particularly, whether the infarct is anterior or bilateral.

Localization of function of the thalamus can be illustrated through vascular thalamic amnesia. The damage to the tuberothalmic territory appears to have the most extensive effects in relation to this form of amnesia by affecting functions of arousal and orientation, learning and memory, personality, and executive function.
