= Anterior inferior cerebellar artery =

Major blood supply to the cerebellum

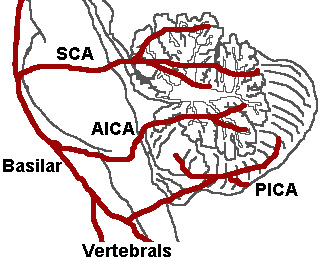
- The three major arteries of the cerebellum: the SCA, anterior inferior cerebellar artery (AICA), and PICA.

- Diagram of the arterial circulation at the base of the brain (inferior view). AICA is labeled at lower right.

Details
- Source: Basilar artery
- Branches: Labyrinthine artery
- Vein: Inferior cerebellar veins
- Supplies: Anteroinferior surface of the cerebellum, the flocculus, middle cerebellar peduncle and inferolateral portion of the pons.

Identifiers
- Latin: arteria inferior anterior cerebelli
- TA98: A12.2.08.019
- TA2: 4550
- FMA: 50544

The anterior inferior cerebellar artery (AICA) is one of three pairs of arteries that supplies blood to the cerebellum.

It arises from the basilar artery on each side at the level of the junction between the medulla oblongata and the pons in the brainstem. It has a variable course, passing backward to be distributed to the anterior part of the undersurface of the cerebellum, anastomosing with both the posterior inferior cerebellar (PICA) branch of the vertebral artery and the superior cerebellar artery.

It also gives off the internal auditory or labyrinthine artery in most cases; however, the labyrinthine artery can less commonly emerge as a branch of the basilar artery.

The amount of tissue receiving blood supply from the AICA is variable, depending upon whether the PICA is more or less dominant, but usually includes the anteroinferior surface of the cerebellum, the flocculus, middle cerebellar peduncle and inferolateral portion of the pons.

== Clinical significance ==
Occlusion of AICA is considered rare, but generally results in a lateral pontine syndrome, also known as AICA syndrome. The symptoms include sudden onset of vertigo, vomiting, nystagmus, dysarthria, falling to the side of the lesion (due to damage to vestibular nuclei), and a variety of same-side features including hemiataxia, loss of all types of sensation of the face (due to damage to the principal sensory trigeminal nucleus), facial paralysis (due to damage to the facial nucleus), and hearing loss and tinnitus (due to damage to the cochlear nuclei). Facial nucleus damage and its resulting paralysis are specific to AICA lesions, and may be the most distinct clinical identifier of this type of stroke before a CT scan or MRI may be obtained.

Vertigo may sometimes present as an isolated symptom several weeks or months before acute ischemia and cerebral infarction occurs, probably with the meaning of transient ischemia of the inner ear or the vestibular nerve.

There is also loss of pain and temperature sensation from the contralateral (opposite-side) limbs and trunk, which can lead to diagnostic confusion with lateral medullary syndrome, which also gives rise to "crossed" neurological signs but does not normally cause cochlear symptoms, severe facial palsy or broad facial sensory loss.
