= Basilar venous plexus =

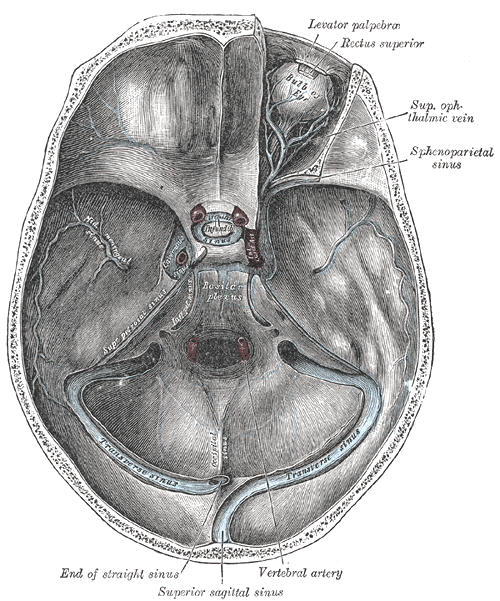
- The sinuses at the base of the skull

Details

Identifiers
- Latin: plexus venosus basilaris
- TA98: A12.3.05.106
- TA2: 4866
- FMA: 50783

The basilar venous plexus (transverse or basilar sinus) is a venous plexus of dural venous sinuses situated upon the clivus and posterior aspect of the dorsum sellae of sphenoid bone. It interconnects the two cavernous sinuses as well as the origins of the petrous sinuses.

It communicates with the anterior vertebral venous plexus.

== Clinical significance ==
The basilar venous plexus can sometimes be involved in certain medical conditions, such as a posterior circulation infarction and a cavernous sinus thrombosis.
