= Basilar sulcus =

Groove in the pons, part of the brainstem

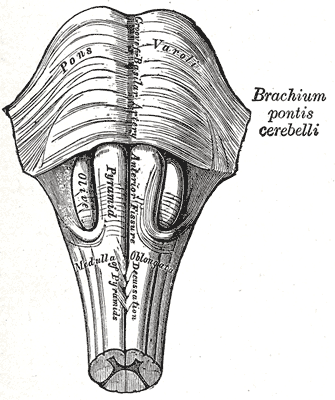
- Medulla oblongata and pons seen from front (Basilar sulcus labeled as Groove for basilar artery at top center)

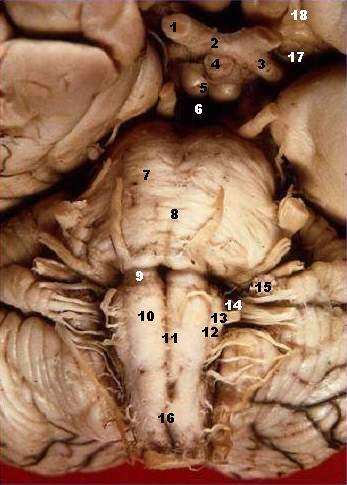
- Human brain and brainstem seen from front and below (basilar sulcus labeled as #8)

Details

Identifiers
- Latin: sulcus basilaris
- TA98: A14.1.05.002
- TA2: 5923
- FMA: 83794

The basilar sulcus (groove for basilar artery) is a groove in the pons, part of the brainstem.

The basilar sulcus is vertical directed and lies in the midline of the pons on its anterior (front) surface. The basilar artery runs within the basilar sulcus.

The basilar sulcus is bounded on either side by an eminence caused by the descent of the cerebrospinal fibers through the substance of the pons.

== Additional images ==
A cross section of the lower pons showing the basilar sulcus at the bottom.
