= Posterior lobe of cerebellum =

- Superior view of an cerebellum. Posterior lobe shown in red.

- The posterior lobe is demarcated by the primary fissure from the anterior lobe .

Details

Identifiers
- Latin: lobus posterior cerebelli
- NeuroNames: 660
- NeuroLex ID: birnlex_911
- TA98: A14.1.07.201
- TA2: 5795
- FMA: 72252

The posterior lobe of cerebellum or neocerebellum is one of the lobes of the cerebellum, below the primary fissure. The posterior lobe is much larger than anterior lobe. The anterior lobe is separated from the posterior lobe by the primary fissure, and the posterolateral fissure separates flocculonodular lobe from the posterior lobe.

Sometimes, the posterior lobe of cerebellum is called the neocerebellum since phylogenetically it is the newest part of the cerebellum. It plays an important role in fine motor coordination, specifically in the inhibition of involuntary movement via inhibitory neurotransmitters, especially GABA.

The posterior lobe receives input mainly from the brainstem (i.e., reticular formation and inferior olivary nucleus) and cerebral cortex.

It also has activation linked to happiness.

== Additional images ==
Animation. Posterior lobe shown in red.

Close up animation. Posterior lobe shown in red.

Dissection video (1 min 20 s). Demonstrating the three cerebellar lobes.
