= Superior cerebellar artery =

Artery of the head

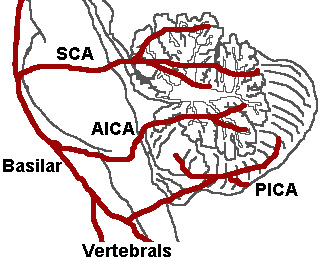
- The three major arteries of the cerebellum: the SCA, AICA, and PICA.

- Diagram of the arterial circulation at the base of the brain (inferior view). (Superior cerebellar artery labeled at center right.)

Details
- Source: Basilar artery
- Vein: Superior cerebellar veins
- Supplies: Cerebellum

Identifiers
- Latin: arteria superior cerebelli
- TA98: A12.2.08.025
- TA2: 4563
- FMA: 50573

The superior cerebellar artery (SCA) is an artery of the head. It arises near the end of the basilar artery. It is a branch of the basilar artery. It supplies parts of the cerebellum, the midbrain, and other nearby structures. It is the cause of trigeminal neuralgia in some patients.

== Structure ==
The superior cerebellar artery arises near the end of the basilar artery. It passes laterally around the brainstem. This is immediately below the oculomotor nerve, which separates it from the posterior cerebral artery. It then winds around the cerebral peduncle, close to the trochlear nerve. It also lies close to the cerebellar tentorium. When it arrives at the upper surface of the cerebellum, it divides into branches which ramify in the pia mater and anastomose with those of the anterior inferior cerebellar arteries and the posterior inferior cerebellar arteries.

Several branches are given to the pineal body, the anterior medullary velum, and the tela chorioidea of the third ventricle.

== Function ==
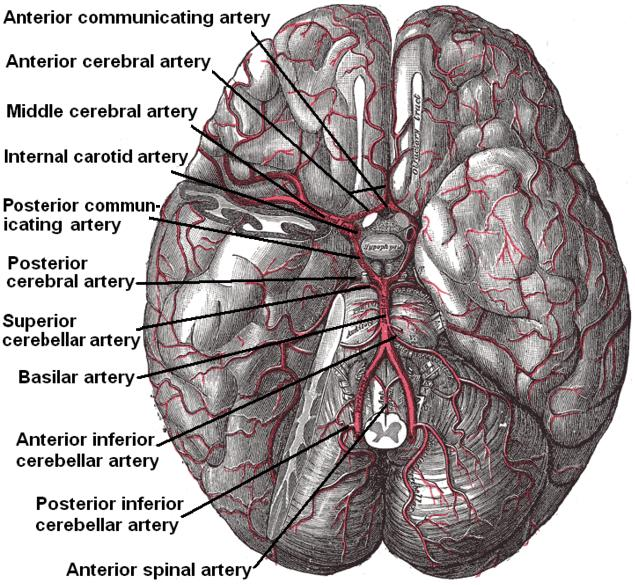
The arteries of the base of the brain. Superior cerebellar artery labeled near center. The temporal pole of the cerebrum and a portion of the cerebellar hemisphere have been removed on the right side (left half of diagram). Inferior aspect (viewed from below).

The superior cerebellar artery supplies deep parts and superior parts of the cerebellum. It supplies parts of the midbrain (tectum, including the cerebral crus). It also supplies superior medullary velum, the superior cerebellar peduncle, the middle cerebellar peduncle, and the interpeduncular region.

== Clinical significance ==
=== Trigeminal neuralgia ===
The superior cerebellar artery frequently causes trigeminal neuralgia by compressing the trigeminal nerve (CN V) causing facial pain (the distribution of the nerve). Vascular microsurgery may be able to decompress the trigeminal nerve. At autopsy, 50% of people without trigeminal neuralgia will also be noted to have vascular compression of the nerve.

=== Stroke ===
An infarction of the superior cerebellar artery can cause a cerebellar stroke. This can cause a headache and ataxia (with problems walking).

== See also ==
- Posterior cerebral artery
