= Pons =

Part of the brainstem in humans and other bipeds

- Pons in the brainstem

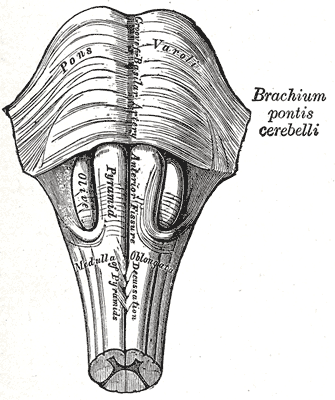
- Anteroinferior view of the medulla oblongata and pons

Details
- Part of: Brain stem
- Artery: Pontine arteries
- Vein: Transverse and lateral pontine veins

Identifiers
- MeSH: D011149
- NeuroNames: 547
- NeuroLex ID: birnlex_733
- TA98: A14.1.03.010
- TA2: 5921
- FMA: 67943

The pons (from Latin pons, 'bridge') is the part of the brainstem that, in humans and other mammals, lies inferior to the midbrain, superior to the medulla oblongata, and anterior to the cerebellum.

The pons is also called the pons Varolii ('bridge of Variolus'), after the Italian anatomist and surgeon Costanzo Varolio (1543–1575). The pons contains neural pathways and nerve tracts that conduct signals from the brain down to the cerebellum and medulla, as well as pathways that carry the sensory signals up into the thalamus.

== Structure ==
The pons in humans measures about 2.5 centimetres (0.98 in) in length. It is the part of the brainstem situated between the midbrain and the medulla oblongata. The horizontal medullopontine sulcus demarcates the boundary between the pons and medulla oblongata on the ventral aspect of the brainstem, and the roots of cranial nerves 6, 7, and 8 emerge from the brainstem along this groove. The junction of pons, medulla oblongata, and cerebellum forms the cerebellopontine angle. The superior pontine sulcus separates the pons from the midbrain. Posteriorly, the pons curves on either side into a middle cerebellar peduncle.

A cross-section of the pons divides it into a ventral and a dorsal area. The ventral pons is known as the basilar part, and the dorsal pons is known as the pontine tegmentum.

The ventral aspect of the pons faces the clivus, with the pontine cistern intervening between the two structures. The ventral surface of the pons features a midline basilar sulcus along which the basilar artery may or may not course. There is a bulge to either side of the basilar sulcus, created by the pontine nuclei that are interweaved amid the descending fibres within the substance of the pons. The superior cerebellar artery winds around the upper margin of the pons.

=== Vasculature ===
Most of the pons is supplied by the pontine arteries, which arise from the basilar artery. A smaller portion of the pons is supplied by the anterior and posterior inferior cerebellar arteries.

=== Development ===
During embryonic development, the metencephalon develops from the rhombencephalon and gives rise to two structures: the pons and the cerebellum. The alar plate produces sensory neuroblasts, which will give rise to the solitary nucleus and its special visceral afferent (SVA) column; the cochlear and vestibular nuclei, which form the special somatic afferent (SSA) fibers of the vestibulocochlear nerve, the spinal and principal trigeminal nerve nuclei, which form the general somatic afferent column (GSA) of the trigeminal nerve, and the pontine nuclei, which relay to the cerebellum.

Basal plate neuroblasts give rise to the abducens nucleus, which forms the general somatic efferent fibers (GSE); the facial and motor trigeminal nuclei, which form the special visceral efferent (SVE) column; and the superior salivatory nucleus, which forms the general visceral efferent fibers (GVE) of the facial nerve.

=== Nuclei ===
Cross-section of lower pons, axons shown in blue, grey matter in light grey. Anterior is down and posterior is up

A number of cranial nerve nuclei are present in the pons:

- mid-pons: the principal sensory nucleus of trigeminal nerve (5)
- mid-pons: the motor nucleus for the trigeminal nerve (5)
- lower down in the pons: abducens nucleus (6)
- lower down in the pons: facial nerve nucleus (7)
- lower down in the pons: vestibulocochlear nuclei (vestibular nuclei and cochlear nuclei) (8)

== Function ==
Functions of these four cranial nerves (5–8) include regulation of respiration; control of involuntary actions; sensory roles in hearing, equilibrium, and taste; and in facial sensations such as touch and pain, as well as motor roles in eye movement, facial expressions, chewing, swallowing, and the secretion of saliva and tears.

The pons contains nuclei that relay signals from the forebrain to the cerebellum, along with nuclei that deal primarily with sleep, respiration, swallowing, bladder control, hearing, equilibrium, taste, eye movement, facial expressions, facial sensation, and posture.

Within the pons is the pneumotaxic center consisting of the subparabrachial and the medial parabrachial nuclei. This center regulates the transition from inhalation to exhalation.

The pons is implicated in sleep paralysis, and may also play a role in generating dreams.

== Clinical significance ==
- Central pontine myelinolysis is a demyelinating disease that causes difficulty with sense of balance, walking, sense of touch, swallowing and speaking. In a clinical setting, it is often associated with transplant or rapid correction of blood sodium. Undiagnosed, it can lead to death or locked-in syndrome.

== Other animals ==
=== Evolution ===
The pons first evolved as an offshoot of the medullary reticular formation. Since lampreys possess a pons, it has been argued that it must have evolved as a region distinct from the medulla by the time the first agnathans appeared, 525 million years ago.

== Additional images ==
Location and topography of pons (animation)

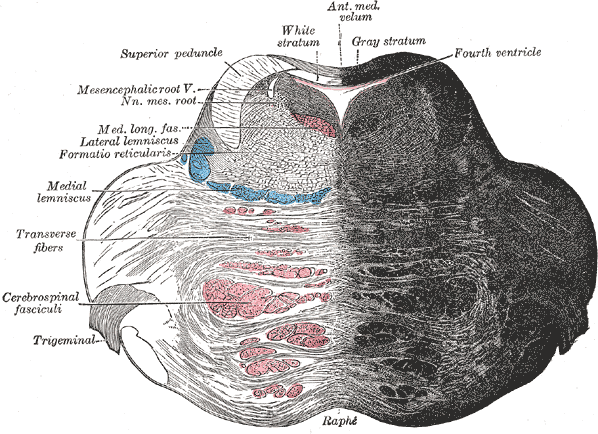
Axial section of the pons, at its upper part

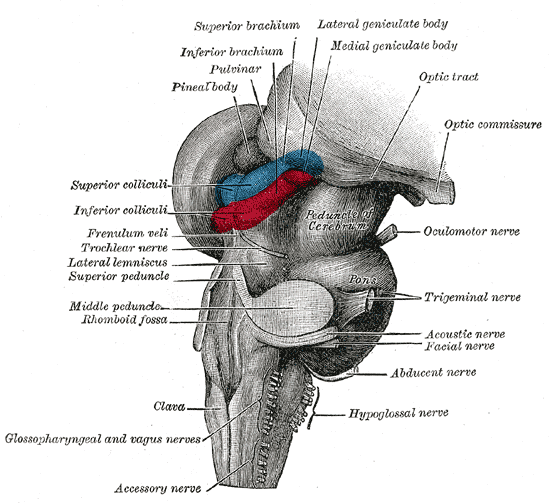
Hind- and mid-brains; posterolateral view

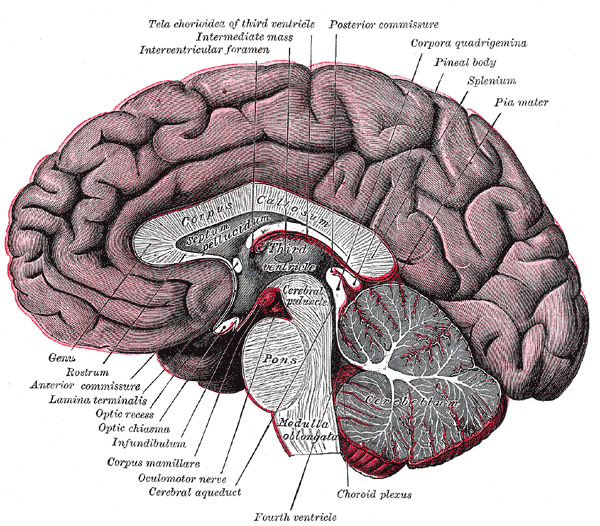
Median sagittal section of brain

Nuclei of the pons and brainstem

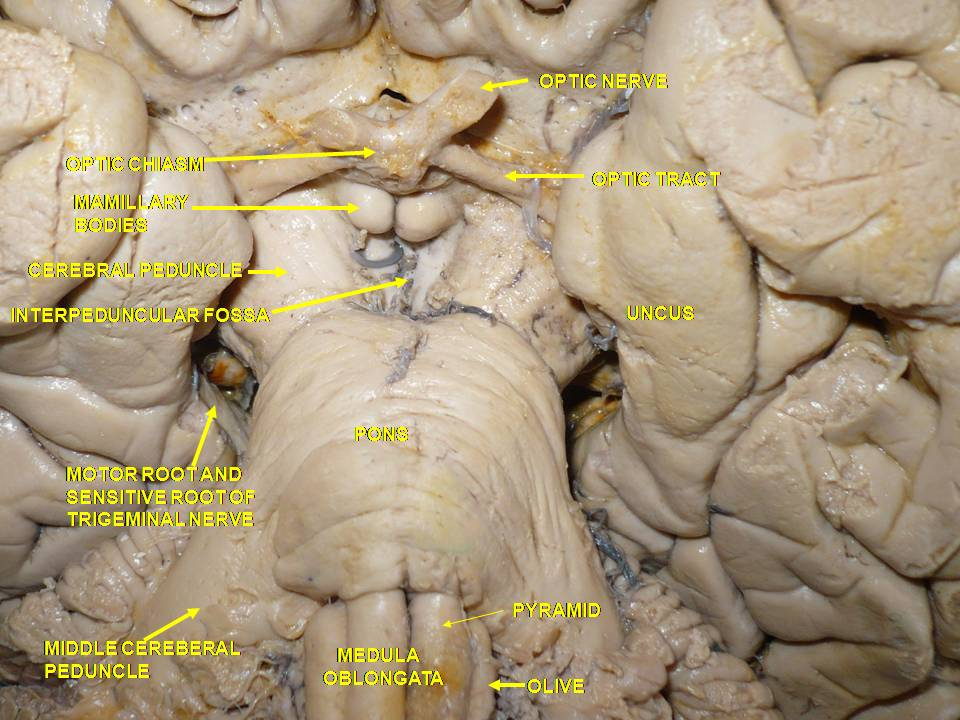
Cerebrum. Deep dissection. Inferior dissection.
