= Cerebellar hemisphere =

Each of the two halves of the cerebellum in the brain

- Superior view of the cerebellum Left cerebellar hemisphere Right cerebellar hemisphere

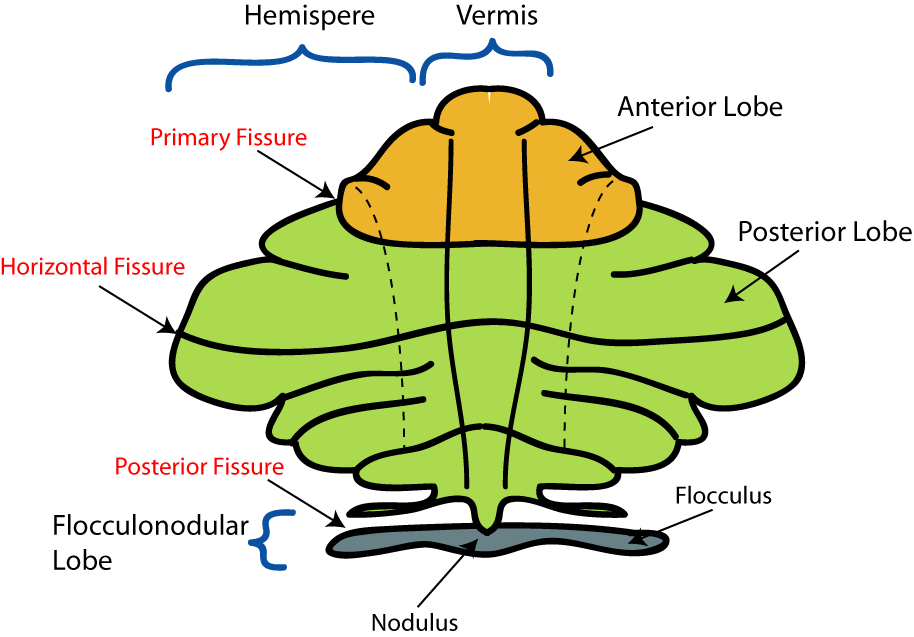
- Schematic representation of the major anatomical subdivisions of the cerebellum. Superior view of an "unrolled" cerebellum, placing the vermis in one plane.

Details

Identifiers
- Latin: hemisphaerium cerebelli
- NeuroNames: 1214
- NeuroLex ID: birnlex_1575
- TA98: A14.1.07.004
- TA2: 5804
- FMA: 76925

The cerebellar hemispheres are the two lateral halves of the cerebellum. They are joined by the vermis.

== Sections ==
- The "intermediate hemisphere" is also known as the "spinocerebellum".
- The "lateral hemisphere" is also known as the "pontocerebellum".
- The lateral hemisphere is considered the portion of the cerebellum to develop most recently.

== Additional images ==
Animation
Left cerebellar hemisphere
Right cerebellar hemisphere

Close up animation

Dissection video (45 s). Demonstrating the two cerebellar hemispheres.

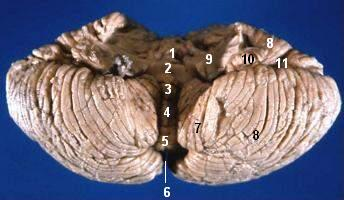
Human cerebellum anterior view description (Cerebellar hemisphere is #8.)

== See also ==
- Anatomy of the cerebellum
