= Basilar artery =

Artery that supplies the brain with blood

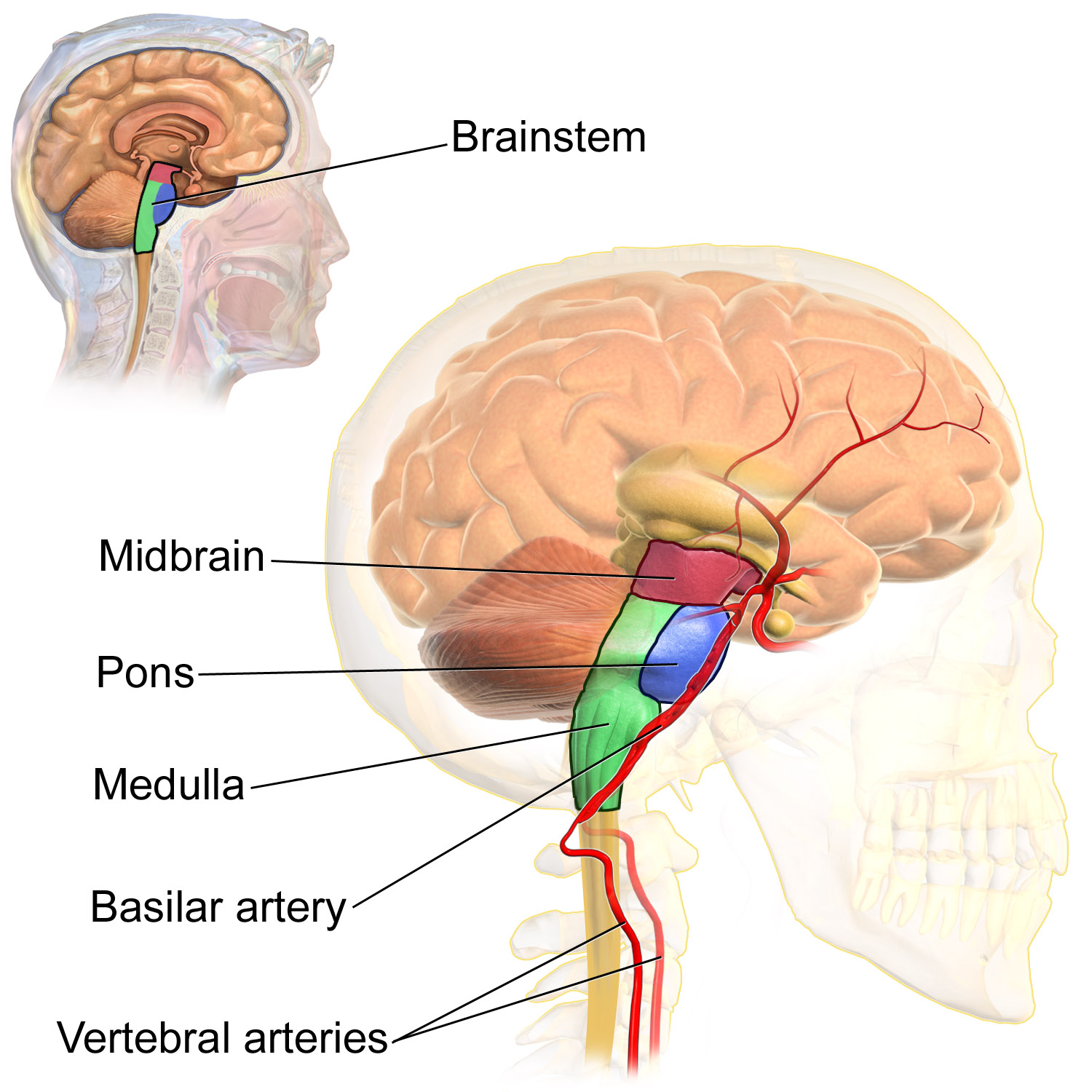
- The basilar artery lies at the front of the brainstem in the midline and is formed from the union of the two vertebral arteries.

- Diagram of the arterial circulation at the base of the brain (inferior view). The basilar artery terminates by splitting into the left and right posterior cerebral arteries.

Details
- Source: Vertebral arteries
- Branches: Pontine arteries anterior inferior cerebellar (AICA); Paramedian arteries superior cerebellar arteries terminal posterior cerebral arteries
- Supplies: Pons, and superior and inferior aspects of the cerebellum

Identifiers
- Latin: arteria basilaris
- MeSH: D001488
- TA98: A12.2.07.081
- TA2: 4548
- FMA: 50542

The basilar artery (U.K.: /ˈbæz.ɪ.lə/; U.S.: /ˈbæs.ə.lər/) is one of the arteries that supplies the brain with oxygen-rich blood.

The two vertebral arteries and the basilar artery are known as the vertebral basilar system, which supplies blood to the posterior part of the circle of Willis and joins with blood supplied to the anterior part of the circle of Willis from the internal carotid arteries.

== Structure ==
The diameter of the basilar artery range from 1.5 to 6.6 mm.

=== Origin ===
The basilar artery arises from the union of the two vertebral arteries at the junction between the medulla oblongata and the pons between the abducens nerves (CN VI).

=== Course ===
It ascends along the basilar sulcus of the ventral pons. It divides at the junction of the midbrain and pons into the posterior cerebral arteries.

=== Branches ===
Its branches from caudal to rostral include:

- anterior inferior cerebellar artery
- labyrinthine artery (<15% of people, usually branches from the anterior inferior cerebellar artery)
- pontine arteries
- superior cerebellar artery

== Clinical relevance ==
A basilar artery stroke classically leads to locked-in syndrome.

== Additional images ==
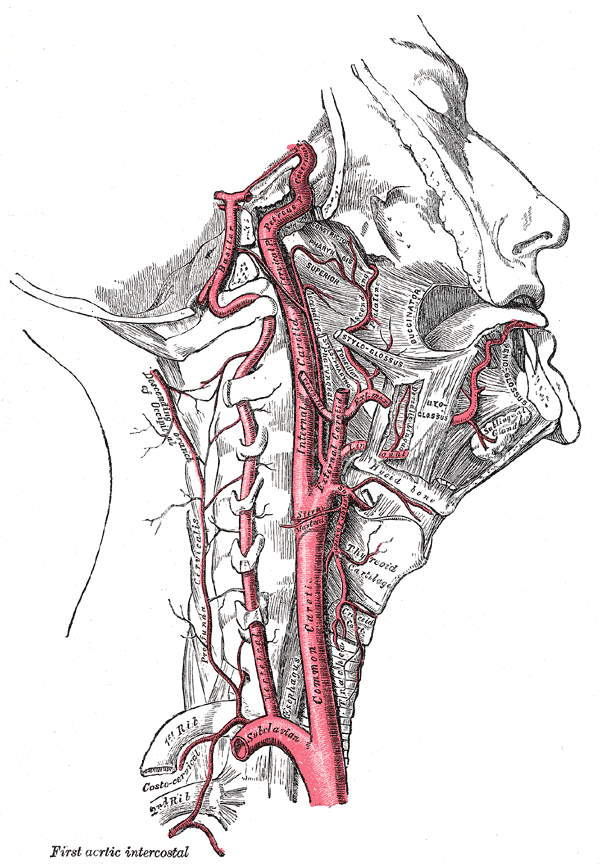
The internal carotid and vertebral arteries (Right side view)

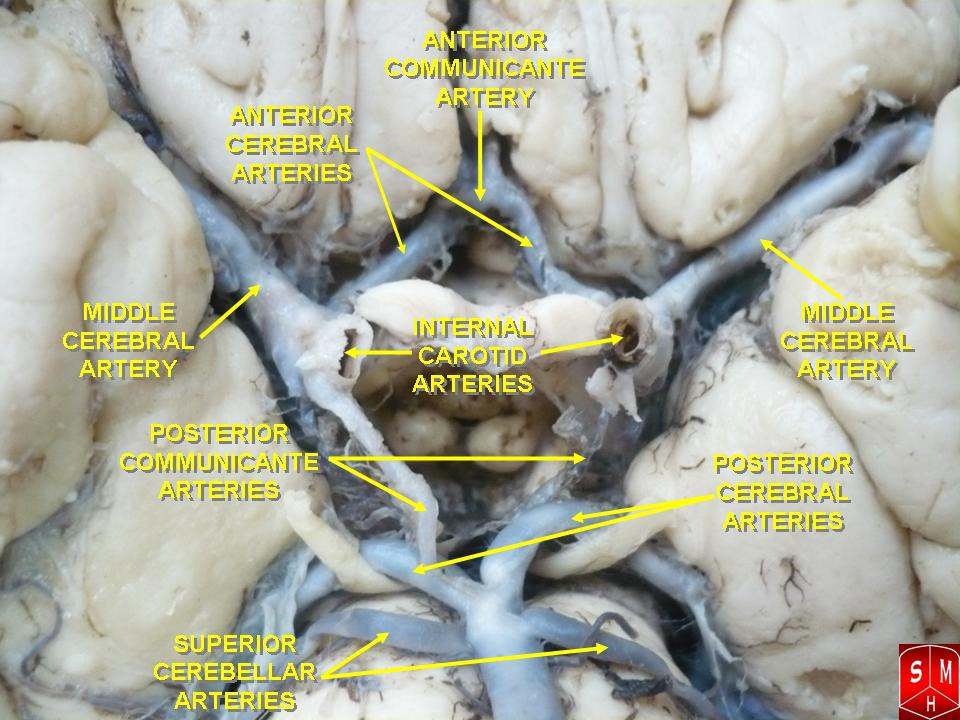
Basilar artery

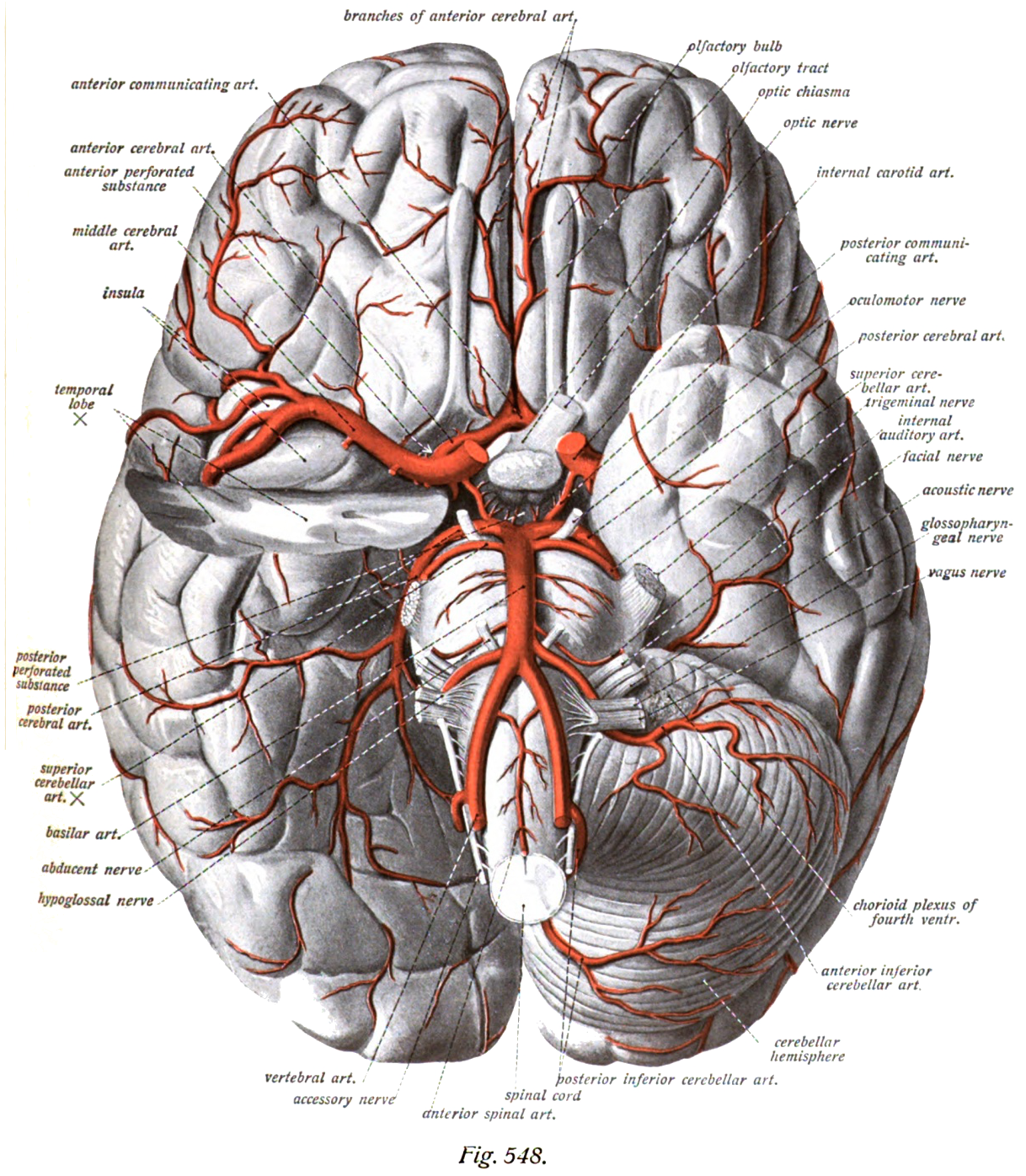
The arteries of the base of the brain. Basilar artery labeled below center. The temporal pole of the cerebrum and the cerebellar hemisphere have been removed on the right side. Inferior aspect (viewed from below).
