= Taenia of fourth ventricle =

Bands of white matter in the brain

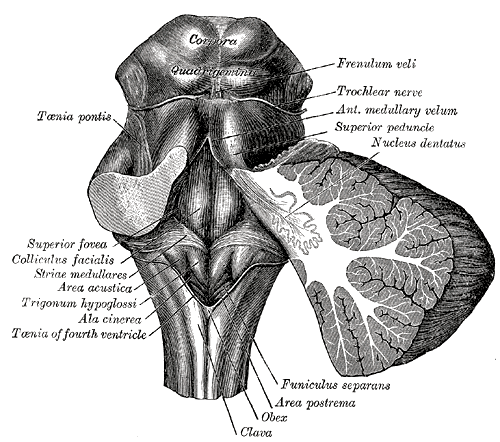
- Rhomboid fossa. (Taenia of fourth ventricle labeled at bottom left.)

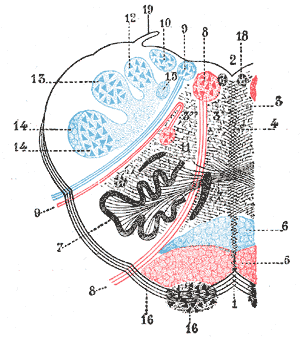
- The formatio reticularis of the medulla oblongata, shown by a transverse section passing through the middle of the olive. (Testut.) 1. Anterior median fissure. 2. Fourth ventricle. 3. Formatio reticularis, with 3’, its internal part (reticularis alba), and 3’’, its external part (reticularis grisea). 4. Raphé. 5. Pyramid. 6. Lemniscus. 7. Inferior olivary nucleus with the two accessory olivary nuclei. 8. Hypoglossal nerve, with 8’, its nucleus of origin. 9. Vagus nerve, with 9’, its nucleus of termination. 10. Lateral dorsal acoustic nucleus. 11. Nucleus ambiguus (nucleus of origin of motor fibers of glossopharyngeal, vagus, and cerebral portion of spinal accessory). 12. Gracile nucleus. 13. Cuneate nucleus. 14. Head of posterior column, with 14’, the lower sensory root of trigeminal nerve. 15. Fasciculus solitarius. 16. Anterior external arcuate fibers, with 16’, the nucleus arcuatus. 17. Nucleus lateralis 18. Nucleus of fasciculus teres. 19. Lingula.

Details

Identifiers
- Latin: taenia ventriculi quarti
- NeuroNames: 632

In the brain, the taenia of the fourth ventricle (lingula, tenia of fourth ventricle) are two narrow bands of white matter, one on either side, which complete the lower part of the roof of the fourth ventricle.

Each consists of a vertical and a horizontal part.

- The vertical part is continuous below the obex with the gracile nucleus, to which it is adherent by its lateral border.
- The horizontal portion extends transversely across the inferior peduncle, below the striae medullares, and roofs in the lower and posterior part of the lateral recess; it is attached by its lower margin to the inferior peduncle, and partly encloses the choroid plexus, which, however, projects beyond it like a cluster of grapes; and hence this part of the tænia has been termed the cornucopia.

== Additional images ==
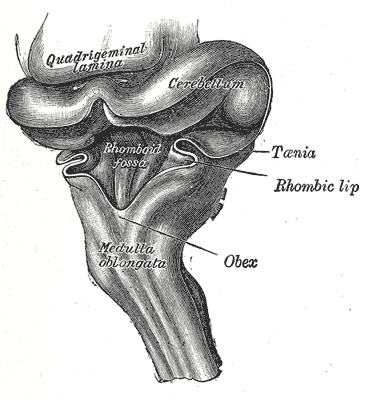
Hind-brain of a human embryo of three months—viewed from behind and partly from left side.

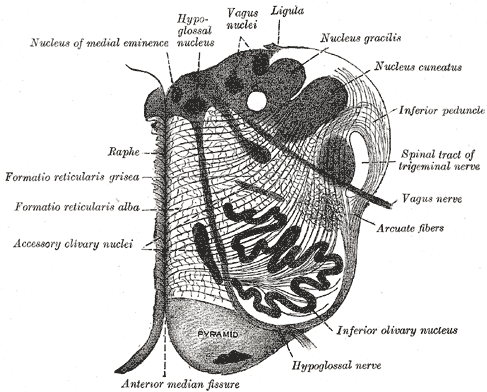
Section of the medulla oblongata at about the middle of the olive.

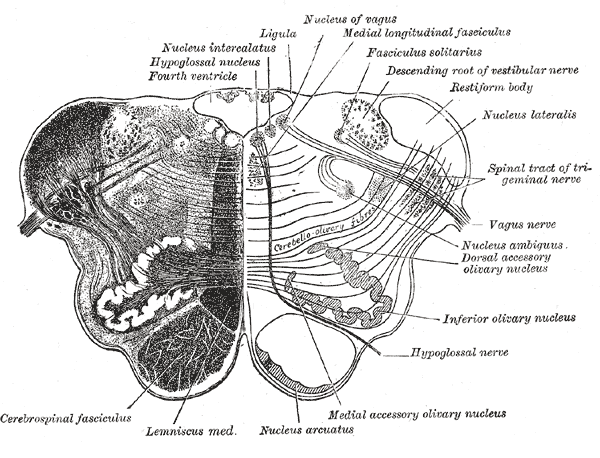
Transverse section of medulla oblongata below the middle of the olive.

== See also ==
- Fourth ventricle
