= Ventricular system =

Cavities within the human brain

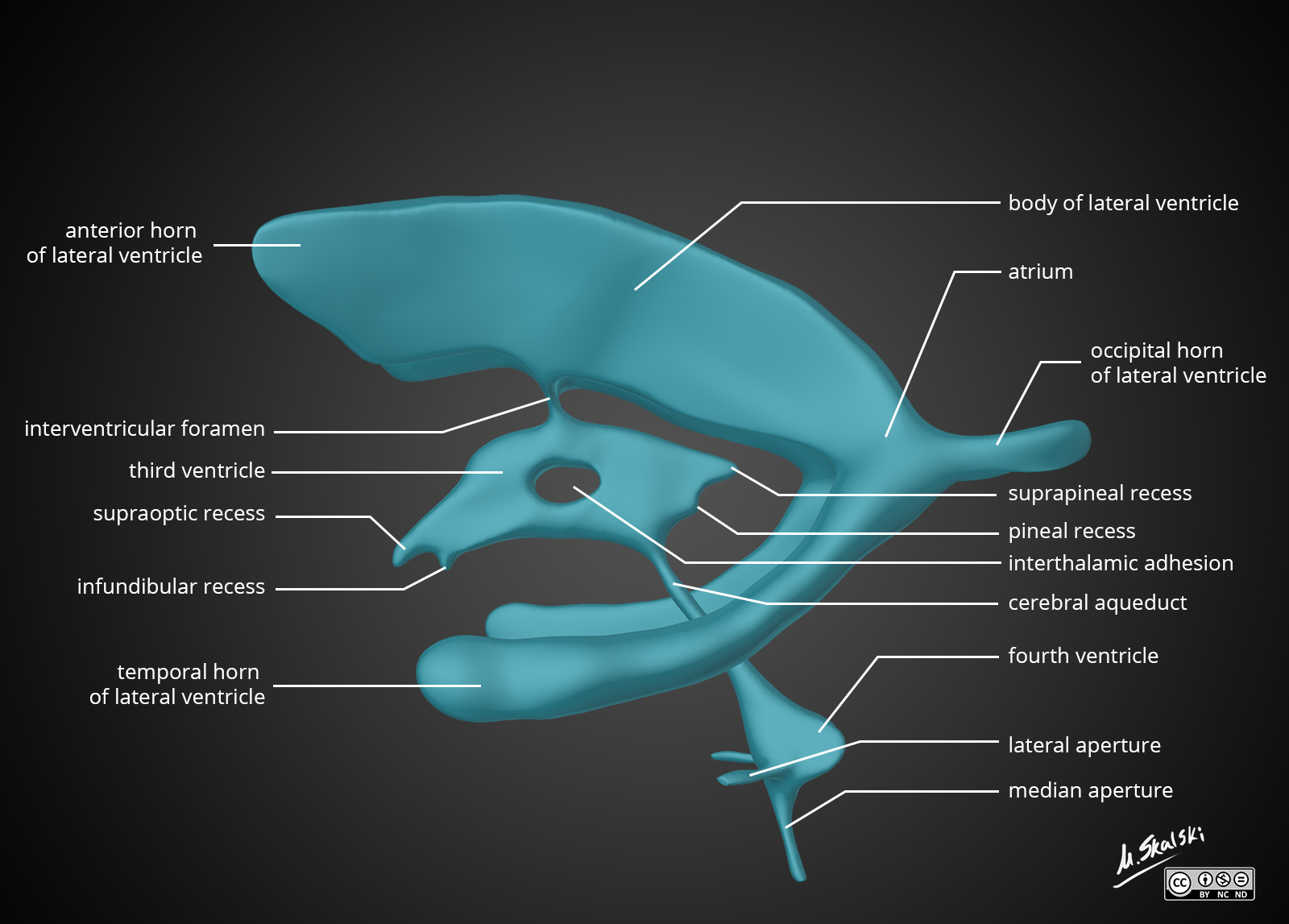
- Ventricular system anatomy

- Rotating 3D rendering of the four ventricles and connections

Details

Identifiers
- Latin: ventriculi cerebri
- MeSH: D002552
- NeuroNames: 2497
- FMA: 242787

In neuroanatomy, the ventricular system is a set of four interconnected cavities known as cerebral ventricles in the brain. Within each ventricle is a region of choroid plexus which produces the circulating cerebrospinal fluid (CSF). The ventricular system is continuous with the central canal of the spinal cord from the fourth ventricle, allowing for the flow of CSF to circulate.

All of the ventricular system and the central canal of the spinal cord are lined with ependyma, a specialised form of epithelium connected by tight junctions that make up the blood–cerebrospinal fluid barrier.

== Structure ==
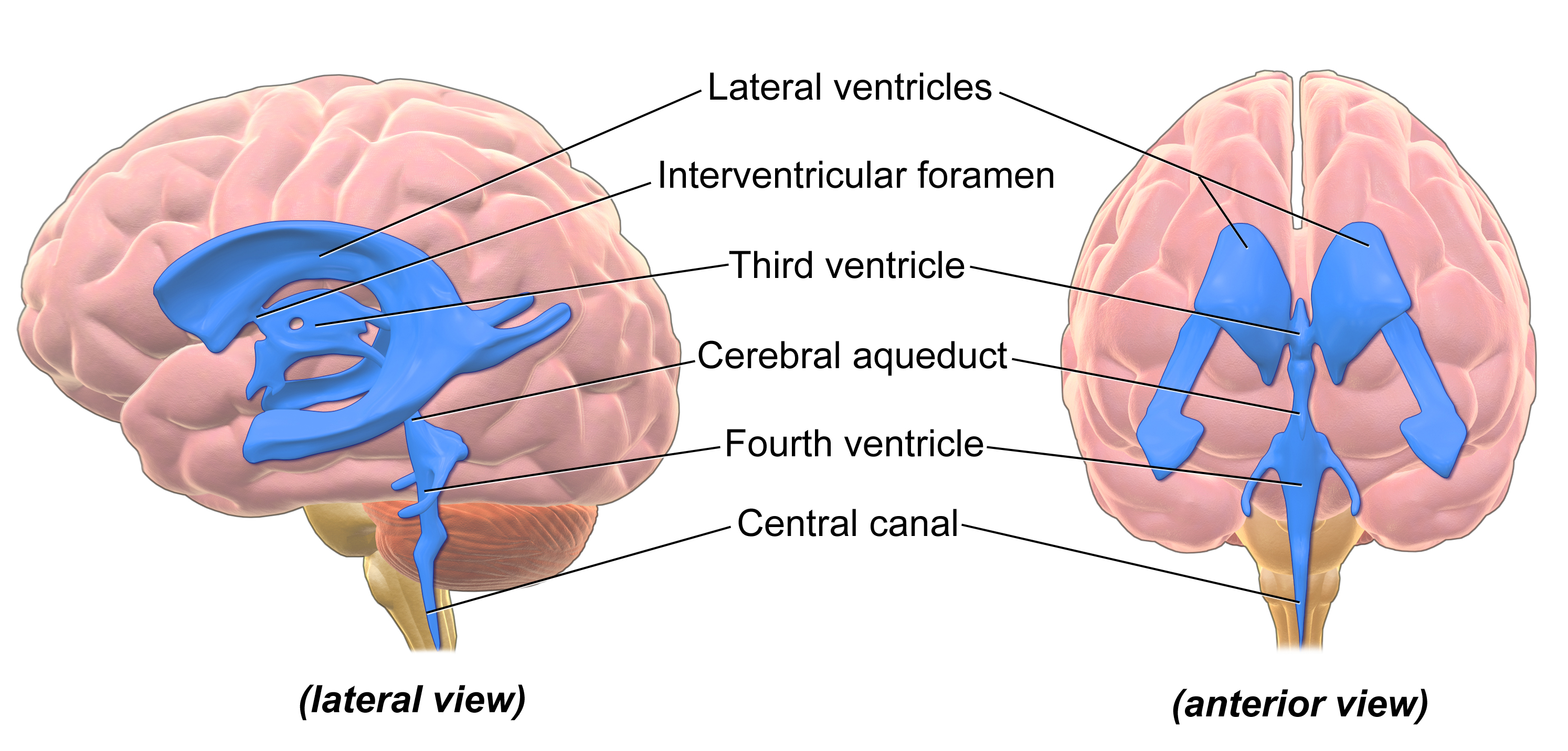
3D rendering of ventricles (lateral and anterior views)

The system comprises four ventricles:

- lateral ventricles right and left (one for each hemisphere)
- third ventricle
- fourth ventricle

There are several foramina, openings acting as channels, that connect the ventricles. The interventricular foramina (also called the foramina of Monro) connect the lateral ventricles to the third ventricle through which the cerebrospinal fluid can flow.

Name	From	To
interventricular foramina (Monro)	lateral ventricles	third ventricle
Cerebral aqueduct (Sylvius)	third ventricle	fourth ventricle
Median aperture (Magendie)	fourth ventricle	subarachnoid space via the cisterna magna
Right and left lateral apertures (Luschka)	fourth ventricle	subarachnoid space via the cistern of great cerebral vein

=== Ventricles ===
The four cavities of the human brain are called ventricles. The two largest are the lateral ventricles in the cerebrum, the third ventricle is in the diencephalon medulla oblongata of the hindbrain. The ventricles are concerned with the production and circulation of cerebrospinal fluid.

=== Development ===
The structures of the ventricular system are embryologically derived from the neural canal, the centre of the neural tube.

As the part of the primitive neural tube that will develop into the brainstem, the neural canal expands dorsally and laterally, creating the fourth ventricle, whereas the neural canal that does not expand and remains the same at the level of the midbrain superior to the fourth ventricle forms the cerebral aqueduct. The fourth ventricle narrows at the obex (in the caudal medulla), to become the central canal of the spinal cord.

In more detail, around the third week of development, the embryo is a three-layered disc. The embryo is covered on the dorsal surface by a layer of cells called ectoderm. In the middle of the dorsal surface of the embryo is a linear structure called the notochord. As the ectoderm proliferates, the notochord is dragged into the middle of the developing embryo.

As the brain develops, by the fourth week of embryological development three swellings known as brain vesicles have formed within the embryo around the canal, near where the head will develop. The three primary brain vesicles represent different components of the central nervous system: the prosencephalon, mesencephalon and rhombencephalon. These in turn divide into five secondary vesicles. As these sections develop around the neural canal, the inner neural canal becomes known as primitive ventricles. These form the ventricular system of the brain: The neural stem cells of the developing brain, principally radial glial cells, line the developing ventricular system in a transient zone called the ventricular zone.

- The prosencephalon divides into the telencephalon, which forms the cortex of the developed brain, and the diencephalon. The ventricles contained within the telencephalon become the lateral ventricles, and the ventricles within the diencephalon become the third ventricle.
- The rhombencephalon divides into a metencephalon and myelencephalon. The ventricles contained within the rhombencephalon become the fourth ventricle, and the ventricles contained within the mesencephalon become the aqueduct of Sylvius.

Separating the anterior horns of the lateral ventricles is the septum pellucidum: a thin, triangular, vertical membrane which runs as a sheet from the corpus callosum down to the fornix. During the third month of fetal development, a space forms between two septal laminae, known as the cave of septum pellucidum (CSP), which is a marker for fetal neural maldevelopment. During the fifth month of development, the laminae start to close and this closure completes from about three to six months after birth. Fusion of the septal laminae is attributed to rapid development of the alvei of the hippocampus, amygdala, septal nuclei, fornix, corpus callosum and other midline structures. Lack of such limbic development interrupts this posterior-to-anterior fusion, resulting in the continuation of the CSP into adulthood.

== Function ==
=== Flow of cerebrospinal fluid ===
MRI showing flow of CSF

The ventricles are filled with cerebrospinal fluid (CSF) which bathes and cushions the brain and spinal cord within their bony confines. CSF is produced by modified ependymal cells of the choroid plexus found in all components of the ventricular system except for the cerebral aqueduct and the posterior and anterior horns of the lateral ventricles. CSF flows from the lateral ventricles via the interventricular foramina into the third ventricle, and then the fourth ventricle via the cerebral aqueduct in the midbrain. From the fourth ventricle it can pass into the central canal of the spinal cord or into the subarachnoid cisterns via three small foramina: the central median aperture and the two lateral apertures.

According to the traditional understanding of cerebrospinal fluid (CSF) physiology, the majority of CSF is produced by the choroid plexus, circulates through the ventricles, the cisterns, and the subarachnoid space to be absorbed into the blood by the arachnoid villi.

The fluid then flows around the superior sagittal sinus to be reabsorbed via the arachnoid granulations (or arachnoid villi) into the venous sinuses, after which it passes through the jugular vein and major venous system. CSF within the spinal cord can flow all the way down to the lumbar cistern at the end of the cord around the cauda equina where lumbar punctures are performed.

The cerebral aqueduct between the third and fourth ventricles is very small, as are the foramina, which means that they can be easily blocked.

=== Protection of the brain ===
The brain and spinal cord are covered by the meninges, the three protective membranes of the tough dura mater, the arachnoid mater and the pia mater. The cerebrospinal fluid (CSF) within the skull and spine provides further protection and also buoyancy, and is found in the subarachnoid space between the pia mater and the arachnoid mater.

The CSF that is produced in the ventricular system is also necessary for chemical stability, and the provision of nutrients needed by the brain. The CSF helps to protect the brain from jolts and knocks to the head and also provides buoyancy and support to the brain against gravity. (Since the brain and CSF are similar in density, the brain floats in neutral buoyancy, suspended in the CSF.) This allows the brain to grow in size and weight without resting on the floor of the cranium, which would destroy nervous tissue.

== Clinical significance ==
The narrowness of the cerebral aqueduct and foramina means that they can become blocked, for example, by blood following a hemorrhagic stroke. As cerebrospinal fluid is continually produced by the choroid plexus within the ventricles, a blockage of outflow leads to increasingly high pressure in the lateral ventricles. As a consequence, this commonly leads in turn to Hydrocephalus. Medically one would call this post-haemorrhagic acquired hydrocephalus, but is often referred to colloquially by the layperson as "water on the brain". This is an extremely serious condition regardless of the cause of blockage. An endoscopic third ventriculostomy is a surgical procedure for the treatment of hydrocephalus in which an opening is created in the floor of the third ventricle using an endoscope placed within the ventricular system through a burr hole. This allows the cerebrospinal fluid to flow directly to the basal cisterns, thereby bypassing any obstruction. A surgical procedure to make an entry hole to access any of the ventricles is called a ventriculostomy. This is done to drain accumulated cerebrospinal fluid either through a temporary catheter or a permanent shunt.

Other diseases of the ventricular system include inflammation of the membranes (meningitis) or of the ventricles (ventriculitis) caused by infection or the introduction of blood following trauma or haemorrhage (cerebral haemorrhage or subarachnoid haemorrhage).

During embryogenesis in the choroid plexus of the ventricles, choroid plexus cysts can form.

The scientific study of CT scans of the ventricles in the late 1970s gave new insight into the study of mental disorders. Researchers found that individuals with schizophrenia had (in terms of group averages) larger than usual ventricles. This became the first "evidence" that schizophrenia was biological in origin and led to a renewed interest in its study via the use of imaging techniques. Magnetic resonance imaging (MRI) has superseded the use of CT in research in the role of detecting ventricular abnormalities in psychiatric illness.

Whether enlarged ventricles is a cause or a result of schizophrenia has not yet been established. Enlarged ventricles are also found in organic dementia and have been explained largely in terms of environmental factors. They have also been found to be extremely diverse between individuals, such that the percentage difference in group averages in schizophrenia studies (+16%) has been described as "not a very profound difference in the context of normal variation" (ranging from 25% to 350% of the mean average).

The cave of septum pellucidum has been loosely associated with schizophrenia, post-traumatic stress disorder, traumatic brain injury, as well as with antisocial personality disorder. CSP is one of the distinguishing features of individuals displaying symptoms of dementia pugilistica.

== Additional media ==
3D model of ventricular system

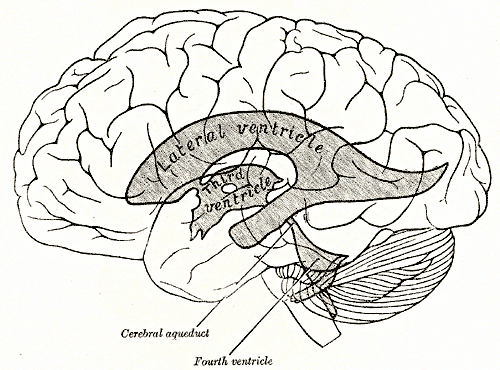
Scheme showing relations of the ventricles to the surface of the brain.

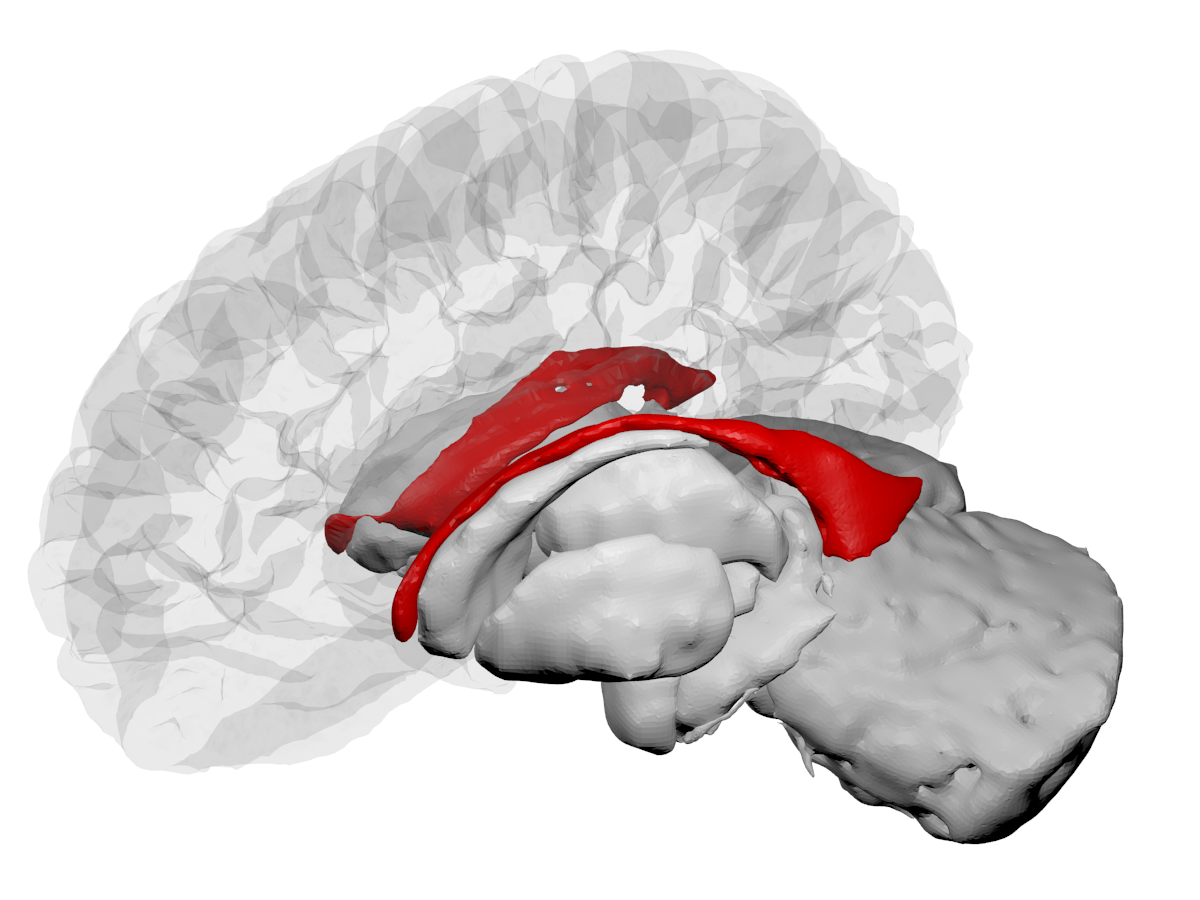
Lateral ventricles along with subcortical structures, in glass brain

== See also ==
- Blood–brain barrier
- Circumventricular organs
