= Rhomboid fossa =

Depression in the human brain

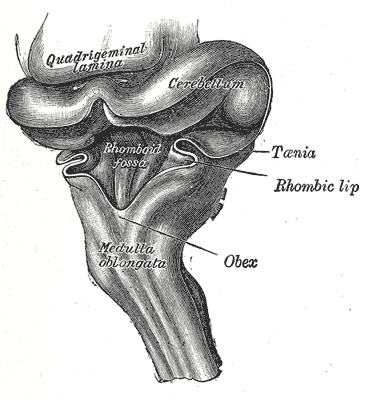
- Hindbrain of a human embryo of three months—viewed from behind and partly from left side. (Rhomboid fossa labeled at center.)

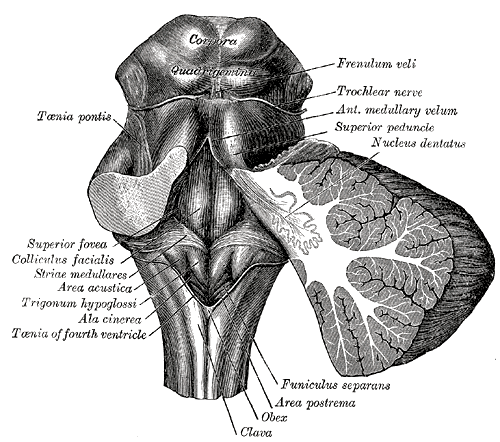
- Rhomboid fossa.

Details

Identifiers
- Latin: fossa rhomboidea
- NeuroNames: 631
- TA98: A14.1.05.702
- TA2: 5971
- FMA: 78486

The rhomboid fossa is a rhombus-shaped depression that is the anterior part of the fourth ventricle. Its anterior wall, formed by the back of the pons and the medulla oblongata, constitutes the floor of the fourth ventricle.

It is covered by a thin layer of grey matter continuous with that of the spinal cord; superficial to this is a thin lamina of neuroglia which constitutes the ependyma of the ventricle and supports a layer of ciliated epithelium.

== Parts ==
The fossa consists of three parts, superior, intermediate, and inferior:

The superior part
The superior part is triangular in shape and limited laterally by the superior cerebellar peduncle; its apex, directed upward, is continuous with the cerebral aqueduct; its base is represented by an imaginary line at the level of the upper ends of the superior foveae.
The intermediate part
The intermediate part extends from this level to that of the horizontal portions of the taeniae of the ventricle; it is narrow above where it is limited laterally by the middle peduncle, but widens below and is prolonged into the lateral recesses of the ventricle.
The inferior part
The inferior part is triangular, and its downwardly directed apex, named the calamus scriptorius (as is shaped like a writing quill-nib) is continuous with the central canal of the closed part of the medulla oblongata.

The sulcus limitans forms the lateral boundary of the medial eminence.

== Features ==
In the superior part of the rhomboid fossa it corresponds with the lateral limit of the fossa and presents a bluish-gray area, the locus coeruleus, which owes its color to an underlying patch of deeply pigmented nerve cells, termed the substantia ferruginea.

At the level of the facial colliculus the sulcus limitans widens into a flattened depression, the superior fovea, and in the inferior part of the fossa appears as a distinct dimple, the inferior fovea.

Lateral to the foveae is a rounded elevation named the area acustica, which extends into the lateral recess and there forms a feebly marked swelling, the tuberculum acusticum.

Winding around the inferior peduncle and crossing the area acustica and the medial eminence are a number of white strands, the striæ medullares, which form a portion of the cochlear division of the acoustic nerve and disappear into the median sulcus.

Below the inferior fovea, and between the hypoglossal trigone and the lower part of the area acustica is a triangular dark field, the vagal trigone, which corresponds to the sensory nucleus of the vagus and glossopharyngeal nerves.

The lower end of the vagal trigone is crossed by a narrow translucent ridge, the funiculus separans, and between this funiculus and the gracile nucleus, is a small tongue-shaped area, the area postrema.

On section it is seen that the funiculus separans is formed by a strip of thickened ependyma, and the area postrema by loose, highly vascular, neuroglial tissue containing nerve cells of moderate size.

== Additional images ==
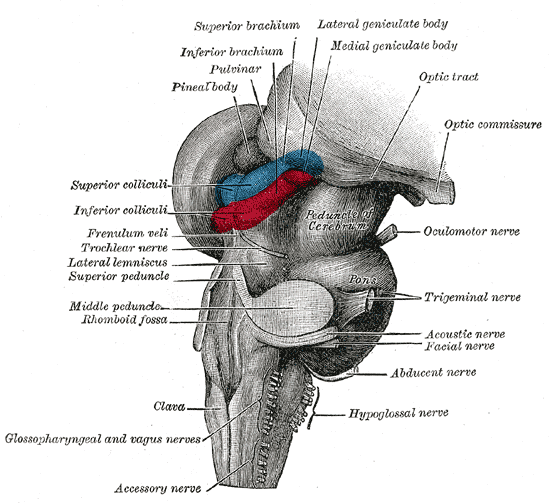
Hind- and mid-brains; postero-lateral view.

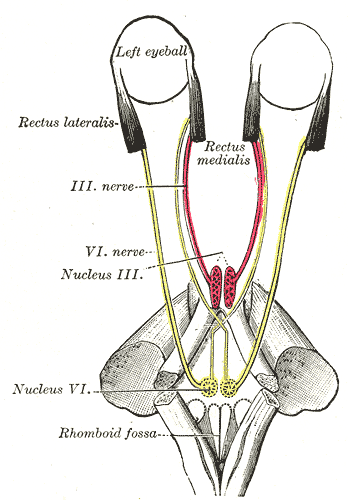
Figure showing the mode of innervation of the Recti medialis and lateralis of the eye.

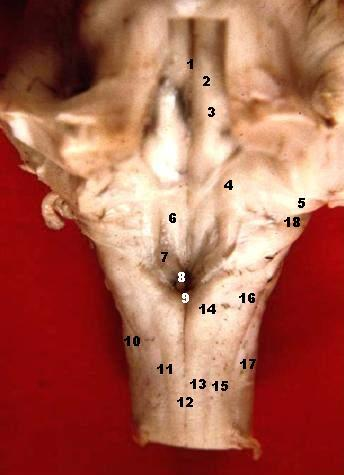
Human caudal brainstem posterior view

== See also ==
- Funiculus (neuroanatomy)
