= Arcuate nucleus (medulla) =

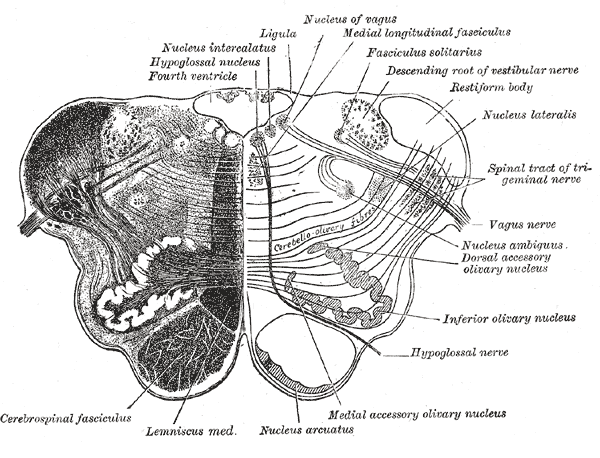
- Transverse section of medulla oblongata below the middle of the olive. ("Nucleus arcuatus" visible near bottom right.)

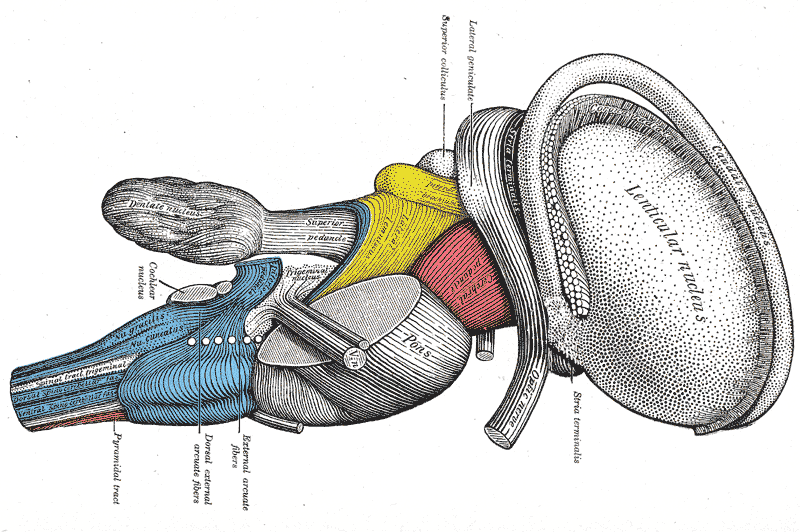
- Dissection of brain-stem. Lateral view. (Labels for "External arcuate fibers" and "Dorsal external arcuate fibers" visible at lower right.)

Details

Identifiers
- Latin: nucleus arcuatus medullae oblongatae
- NeuroNames: 775
- NeuroLex ID: birnlex_2635
- TA98: A14.1.04.256
- TA2: 6016
- FMA: 72609

In the medulla oblongata, the arcuate nucleus is a group of neurons located on the anterior surface of the medullary pyramids. These nuclei are the extension of the pontine nuclei.

They receive afferents from the corticospinal tract.

They in turn project efferents into the cerebellum through the inferior cerebellar peduncle as:

- the anterior internal arcuate fibers which pass along the midline before decussating near the rhomboid fossa (floor of fourth ventricle) then passing laterally as the medullary striae;
- the anterior external arcuate fibers.

== Function ==
Arcuate nuclei are capable of chemosensitivity and have a proven role in the respiratory center controlling the breathing rate.

== Additional images ==
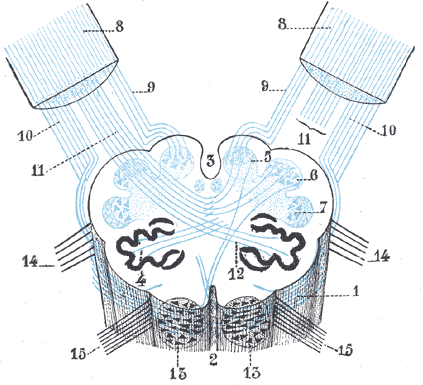
Diagram showing the course of the arcuate fibers.

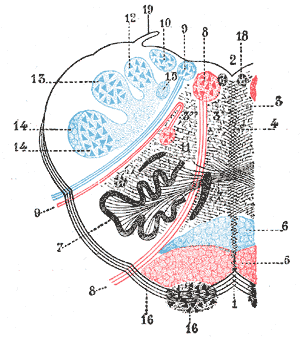
The formatio reticularis of the medulla oblongata, shown by a transverse section passing through the middle of the olive.
