= Hypoglossal nucleus =

Neuron cluster in the brainstem

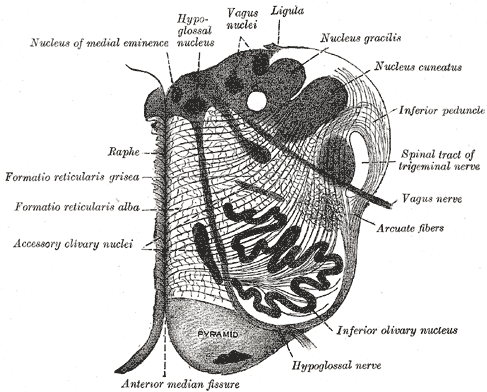
- Section of the medulla oblongata. (Hypoglossal nucleus visible top left.)

- The cranial nerve nuclei schematically represented; dorsal view. Motor nuclei in red; sensory in blue. (XII labeled at bottom left.)

Details

Identifiers
- Latin: nucleus nervi hypoglossi
- NeuroNames: 757
- NeuroLex ID: birnlex_2644
- TA98: A14.1.04.227
- TA2: 6010
- FMA: 54505

The hypoglossal nucleus is a cranial nerve nucleus, found within the medulla. Being a motor nucleus, it is close to the midline. In the open medulla, it is visible as what is known as the hypoglossal trigone, a raised area (medial to the vagal trigone) protruding slightly into the fourth ventricle.

The hypoglossal nucleus is located between the dorsal motor nucleus of the vagus and the midline of the medulla. Axons from the hypoglossal nucleus pass anteriorly through the medulla forming the hypoglossal nerve which exits between the pyramid and olive in a groove called the anterolateral sulcus.

The hypoglossal nucleus plays an important role in maintaining airway patency.

== Additional images ==
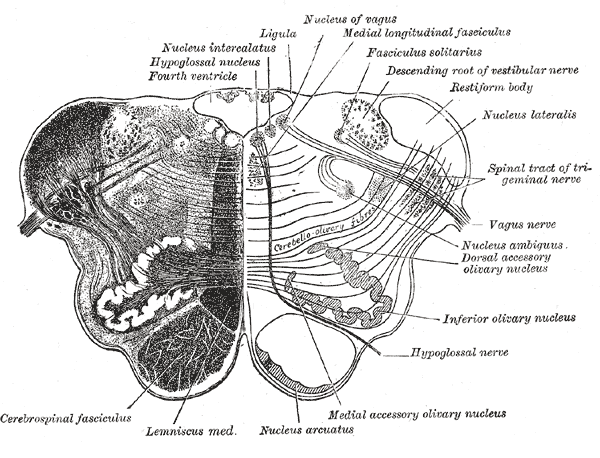
Transverse section of medulla oblongata below the middle of the olive.

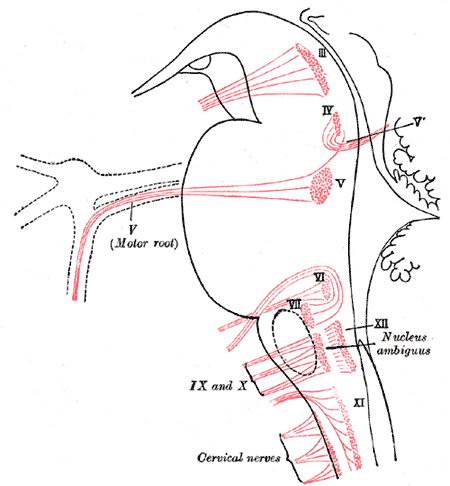
Nuclei of origin of cranial motor nerves schematically represented; lateral view.

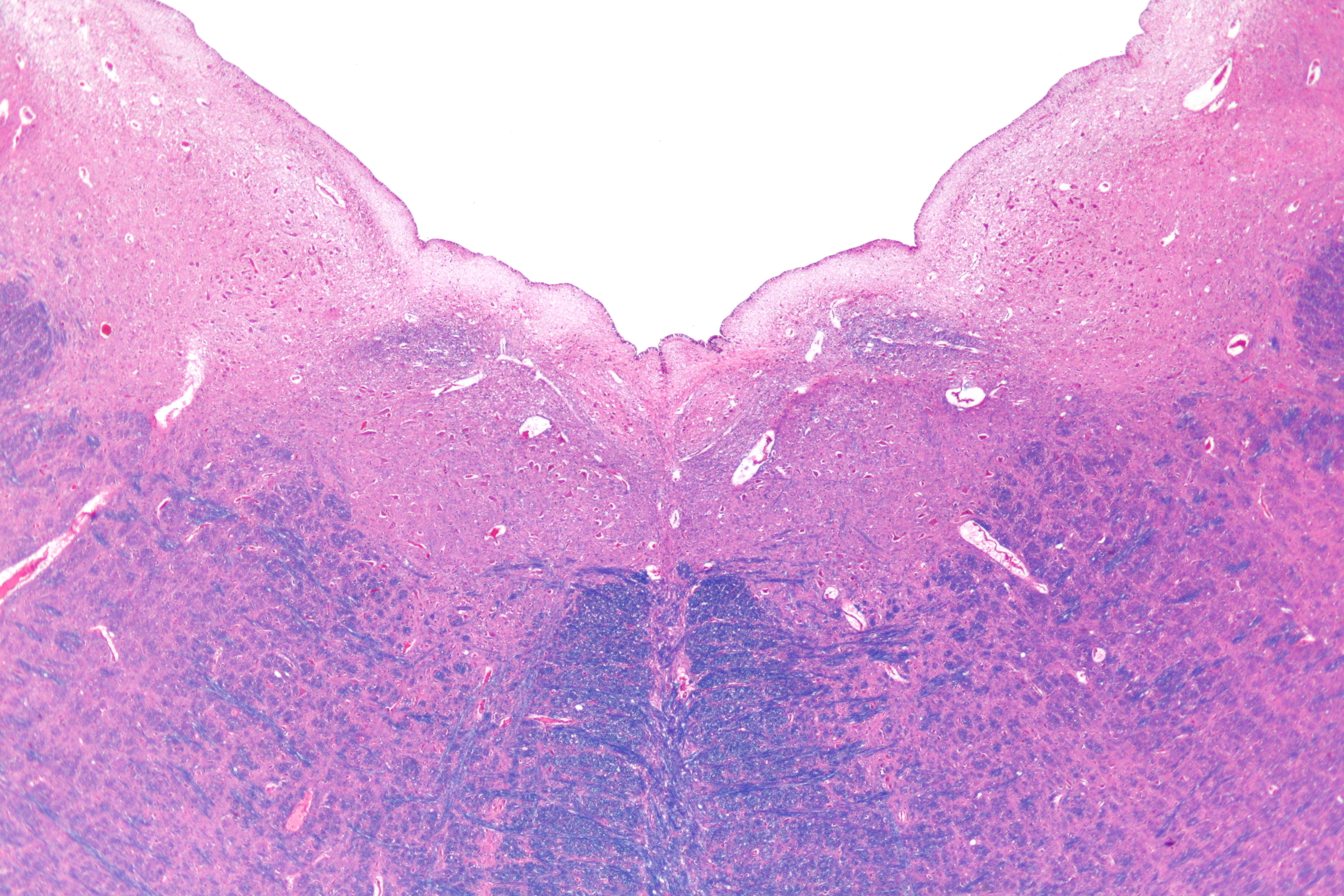
Micrograph showing the hypoglossal nuclei in relation to their surrounding structures.

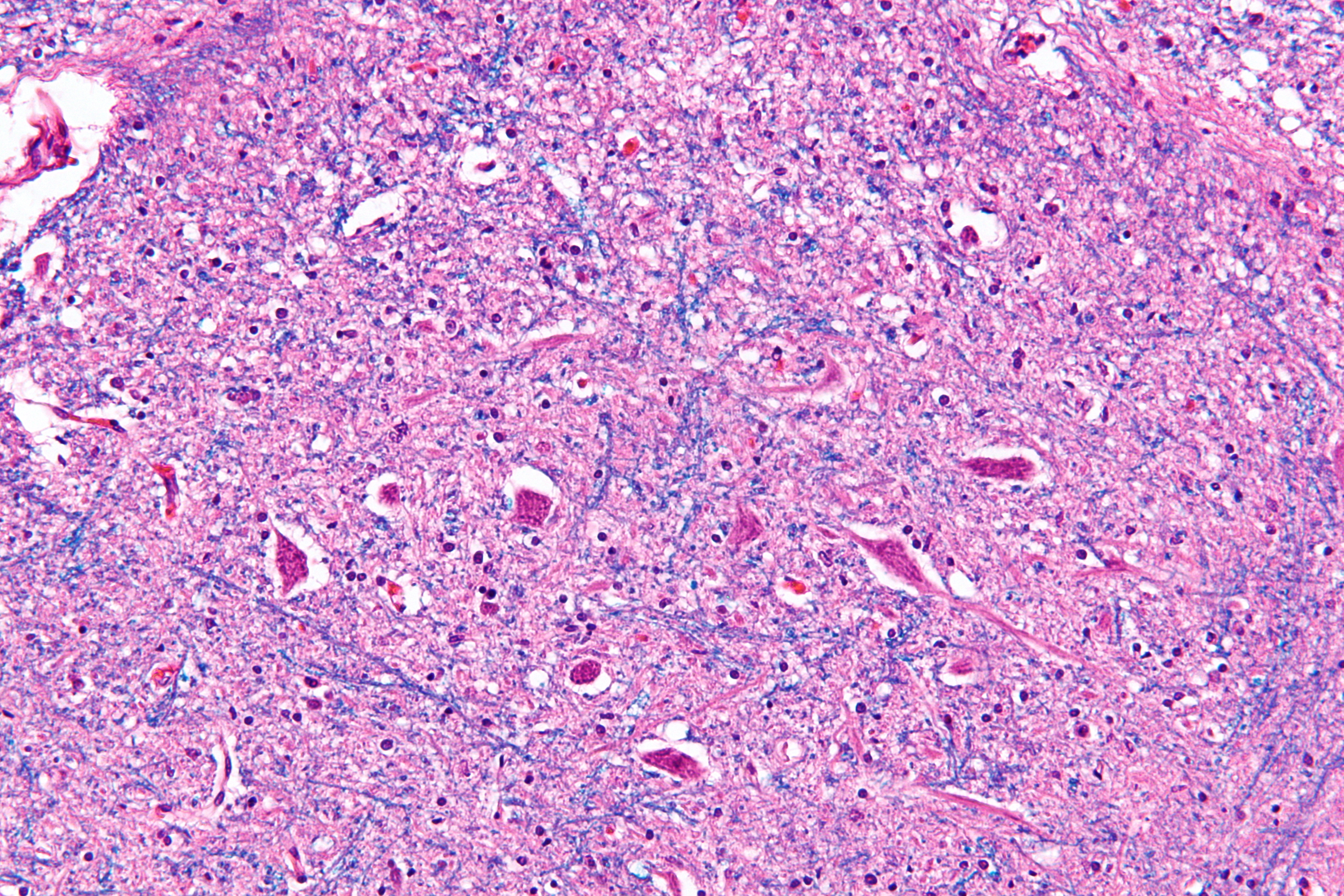
Micrograph showing the hypoglossal nucleus. H&E-LFB stain.
