= Lateral recess =

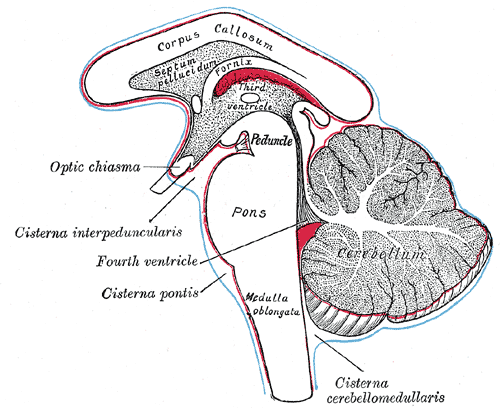
- Diagram showing the positions of the three principal subarachnoid cisterns. (Lateral recess not labeled, but region is visible.)

Details

Identifiers
- Latin: recessus lateralis
- NeuroNames: 642
- TA98: A14.1.05.717
- TA2: 5968
- FMA: 78470

Three-dimensional representation of the ventricular system of the human brain. The fourth ventricle is the lower blue mass. The little points sticking out on the left and right are the two parts of the lateral recess.

Lateral recess of fourth ventricle (also known as the lateral recess), is a paired extension of the fourth ventricle of the brain that projects laterally towards the pontomedullary junction, reaching the lateral border of the brainstem. At this point, the cavity of the fourth ventricle attains its maximum width.

Each lateral recess opens into a lateral aperture (also known as the foramen of Luschka) that opens into the subarachnoid space at the cerebellopontine angle. This aperture provides one of the major pathways through which cerebrospinal fluid (CSF) exits the ventricular system into the subarachnoid space.

Within the area of the lateral recess lie the vestibular area (containing the vestibular nuclei) and the cochlear nuclei, which form part of the vestibulocochlear nerve (cranial nerve VIII). The medullary striae of the fourth ventricle traverse the floor of the ventricle near this area.
