= Cerebellar peduncles =

Structure connecting the cerebellum to the brainstem

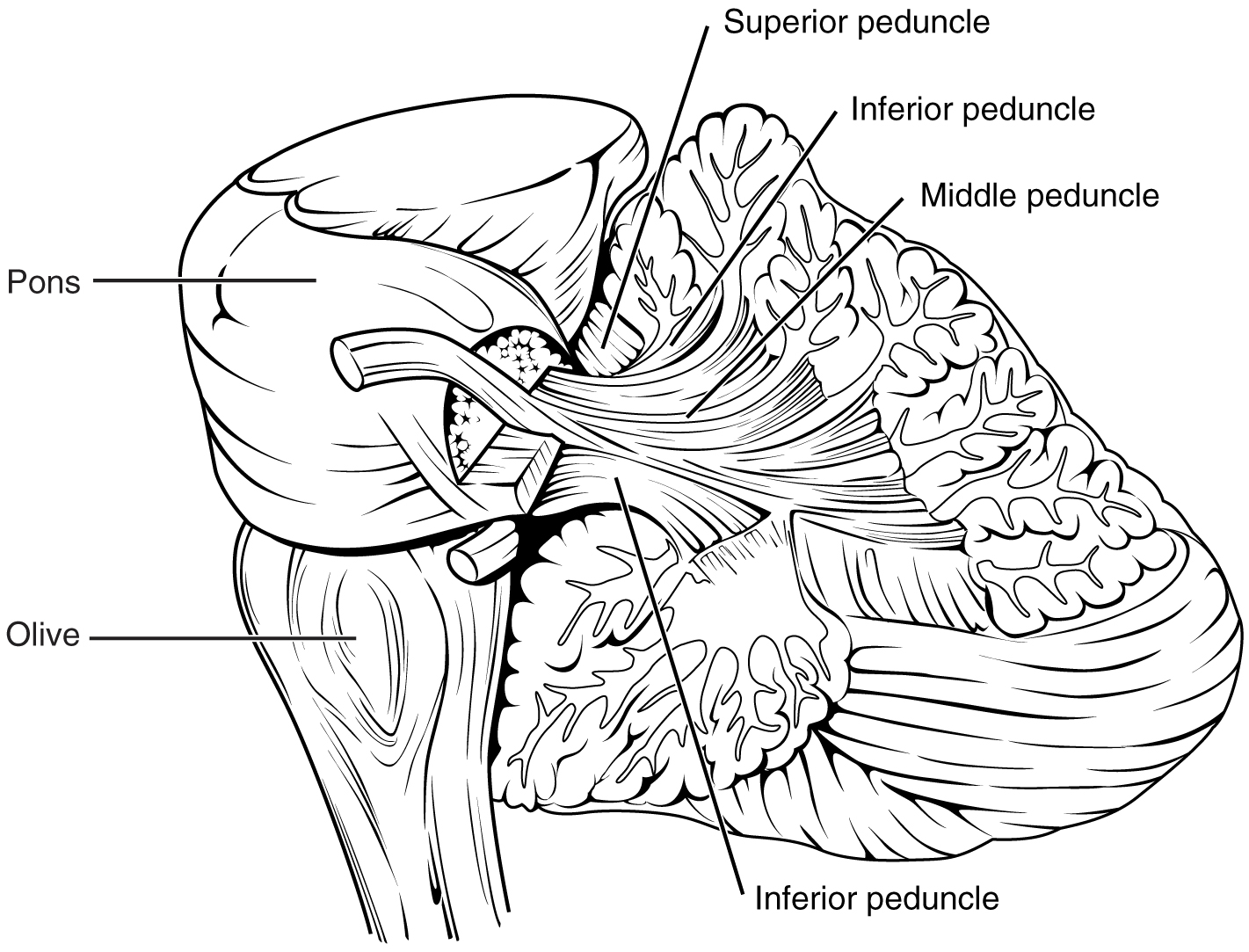

Details

Identifiers
- Latin: pedunculi cerebellares
- NeuroNames: 1207
- NeuroLex ID: birnlex_970
- TA98: A14.1.07.412
- TA2: 5845
- FMA: 77791

The cerebellar peduncles are three paired bundles of fibres that connect the cerebellum to the brainstem.

- The superior cerebellar peduncles are bundles of white matter that connect the cerebellum to the midbrain.
- The middle cerebellar peduncles connect the cerebellum to the pons and are composed primarily of afferent fibers.
- The inferior cerebellar peduncles are thick rope-like strands emerging from the posteriolateral aspect of the upper medulla oblongata.

The peduncles form the lateral border of the fourth ventricle, and form a distinctive diamond – the middle peduncle forming the central corners of the diamond, while the superior and inferior peduncles form the superior and inferior edges, respectively.

== See also ==
- Anatomy of the cerebellum#Peduncles
