= Lateral aperture =

- Animation showing the fourth ventricle (in red). The little points sticking out on the left and right are the two parts of the lateral recess, which end in the foramen of Luschka.

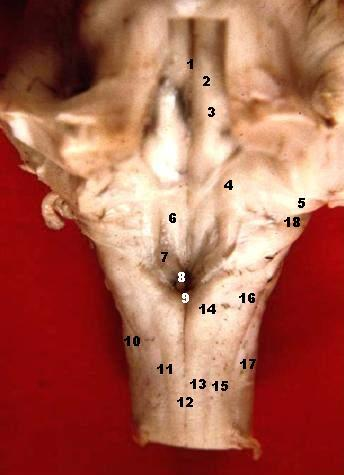
- Human caudal brainstem posterior view (Lateral aperture is #18)

Details

Identifiers
- Latin: apertura lateralis
- Acronym: LA4V
- NeuroNames: 640
- TA98: A14.1.05.718
- TA2: 5969
- FMA: 78473

The lateral aperture, lateral aperture of fourth ventricle or foramen of Luschka (after anatomist Hubert von Luschka) is an opening at the lateral extremity of either lateral recess of the fourth ventricle opening anteriorly into (sources differ) the pontine cistern/lateral cerebellomedullary cistern at cerebellopontine angle. A tuft of choroid plexus commonly extends into the lateral aperture, partially obstructing CSF flow through this aperture.

The opening of the lateral aperture occurs just lateral to cranial nerve VIII, and proximally to the flocculus of cerebellum.
