= Fourth ventricle =

Structure within the human brain

- Animation showing the fourth ventricle (in red) in relation to the ventricular system.

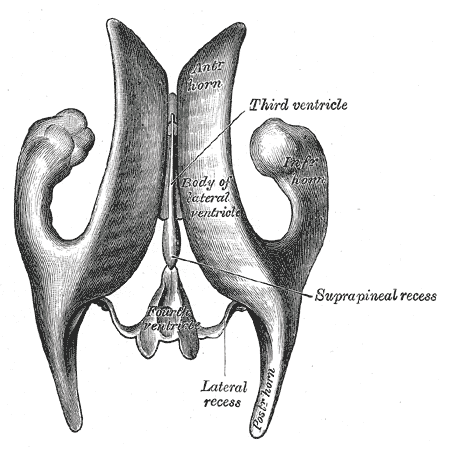
- Drawing of a cast of the ventricular cavities, viewed from above. (Fourth ventricle visible at bottom center.)

Details

Identifiers
- Latin: ventriculus quartus
- MeSH: D020546
- NeuroNames: 621
- NeuroLex ID: birnlex_1256
- TA98: A14.1.05.701
- TA2: 5966
- FMA: 78469

The fourth ventricle is one of the four connected fluid-filled cavities within the human brain. These cavities, known collectively as the ventricular system, consist of the left and right lateral ventricles, the third ventricle, and the fourth ventricle. The fourth ventricle extends from the cerebral aqueduct (aqueduct of Sylvius) to the obex, and is filled with cerebrospinal fluid (CSF).

The fourth ventricle has a characteristic diamond shape in cross-sections of the human brain. It is located within the pons or in the upper part of the medulla oblongata. CSF entering the fourth ventricle through the cerebral aqueduct can exit to the subarachnoid space of the spinal cord through two lateral apertures and a single, midline median aperture.

== Structure ==
Fourth ventricle location shown in red (E), pons (B); the floor of the ventricle is to the right, the roof to the left

The fourth ventricle has a roof at its upper (posterior) surface and a floor at its lower (anterior) surface, and side walls formed by the cerebellar peduncles (nerve bundles joining the structure on the posterior side of the ventricle to the structures on the anterior side). The caudal tip of the fourth ventricle - where it becomes the central canal - is known as the obex; the obex is also a marker for the level of the foramen magnum of the skull and therefore is a marker for the imaginary dividing line between the medulla and spinal cord.

=== Roof ===
The superior portion of the roof (i.e. of the posterior edge) is formed, in the midline, by a thin lamina called the superior medullary velum, and laterally by the cerebellar peduncles. The inferior portion of the roof is formed superiorly by the inferior medullary velum and the cerebellar vermis (covered with choroid plexus), and inferiorly by the tela choroidea. The inferior portion of the roof is where CSF can leave the ventricle through three openings; near each of the three corners of the inferior roof there is an opening into the cisterna magna, the caudal opening is the median aperture, and the lateral apertures at the lateral recesses. The fourth ventricle is the connector between the ventricular system (where CSF is produced) and the subarachnoid space (where CSF is absorbed). The roof rises (i.e. posteriorly) to a peak, known as the fastigium (Latin for "summit"); the fastigial nucleus lies immediately above the roof of the fourth ventricle, in the cerebellum.

=== Floor ===
The floor (i.e. the anterior edge) of the fourth ventricle constitutes the rhomboid fossa, and comprises a number of general features. A sulcus - the median sulcus - extends the length of the ventricle (from the cerebral aqueduct of the midbrain to the central canal of the spinal cord), dividing the floor into right and left halves. Each half is further divided by a further sulcus - the sulcus limitans - along a line parallel to the median sulcus; within the floor, motor neurons are located medially of the sulcus limitans, while sensory neurons are located laterally. The elevation between the median sulcus and sulcus limitans (i.e. the region for motor neurons), is known as the medial eminence, while the lateral region (i.e. that for the sensory neurons) is known as the vestibular area. The sulcus limitans bifurcates at either end - the superior fovea cerebrally, and the inferior fovea caudally.

The pons is located behind the middle and superior portions of the floor. In the superior region of the pons is the locus coeruleus, which due to its concentration of noradrenaline has a sky blue appearance, visible (in a colour closer to teal) through the floor of the ventricle, superiorly to the superior fovea. The internal part of the facial nerve bulges into the ventricle, forming the facial colliculus, in the process of looping around the abducens nucleus within the inferior region of the Pons.

The medulla oblongata is located behind the inferior portion of the floor (and continues caudally of the ventricle). Medullary striae emerge via the median sulcus and run transversely across the floor to become part of the inferior cerebellar peduncle. The hypoglossal nucleus bulges into the floor, creating the hypoglossal trigone, located slightly superiorly to the inferior fovea, within the median eminence. The dorsal nucleus of vagus nerve, within the medulla oblongata, comprises cells that are spindle shaped, also creating a bulge—the vagal trigone—in the region of the floor which overlies them; this is the region inferior of the inferior fovea.

== Development ==
The ventricular system including the fourth ventricle, develops from the central canal of the neural tube. Specifically, the fourth ventricle originates from the portion of the tube that is present in the developing rhombencephalon. During the first trimester of pregnancy the central canal expands into the lateral, third and fourth ventricles, connected by thinner channels. Choroid plexuses appear in the ventricles which produce cerebrospinal fluid. If the flow of fluid is blocked ventricles may become enlarged and cause hydrocephalus.

== Clinical significance ==
The floor of the fourth ventricle is a common location of an intracranial ependymoma in children.

== Additional images ==
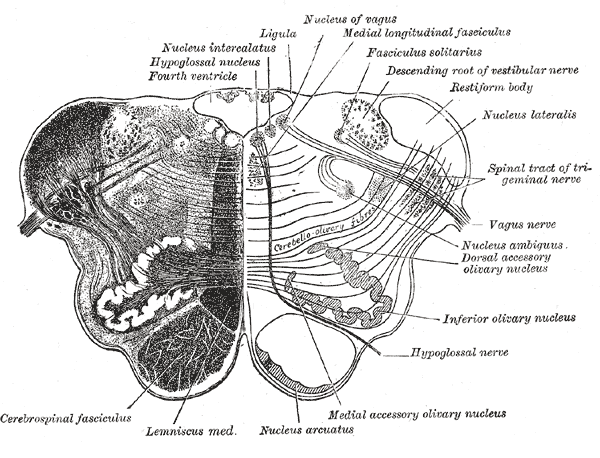
Transverse section of medulla oblongata below the middle of the olive.

Scheme of roof of fourth ventricle.

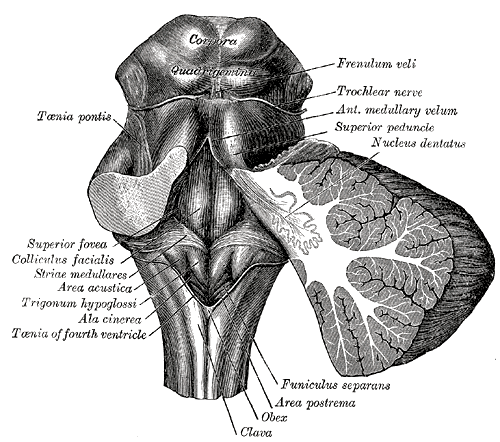
Rhomboid fossa.

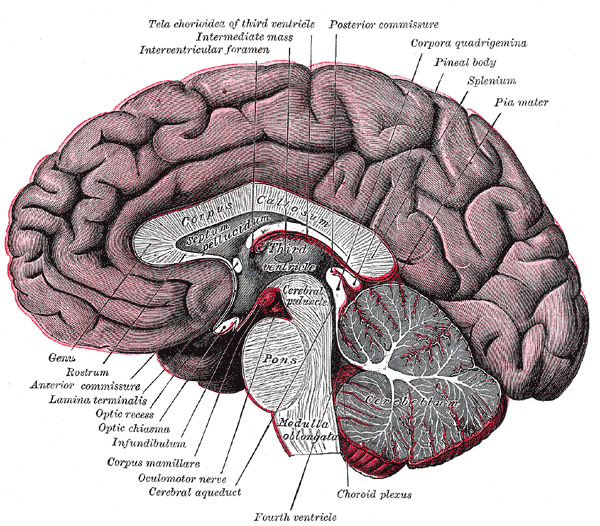
Median sagittal section of brain.

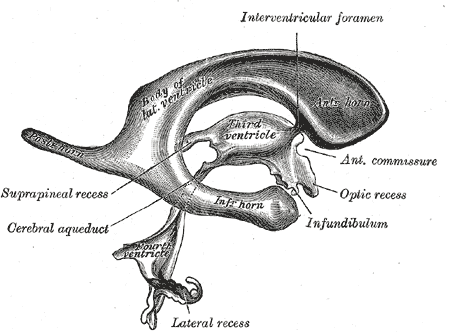
Drawing of a cast of the ventricular cavities, viewed from the side.

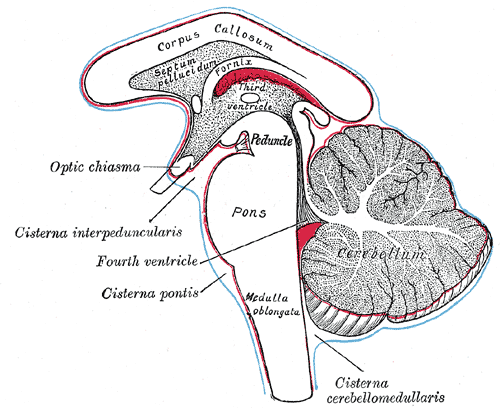
Diagram showing the positions of the three principal subarachnoid cisternæ.

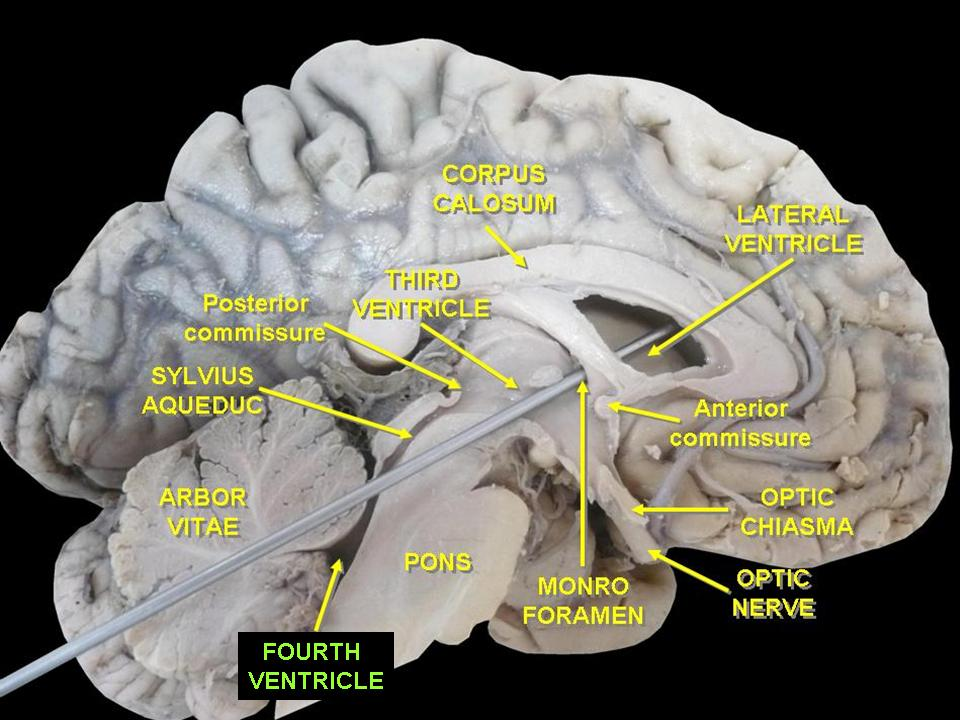
Fourth ventricle
