= Cisterna magna =

Space in the brain

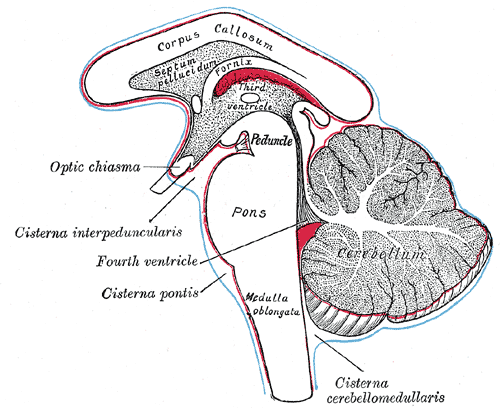
- Diagram showing the positions of the three principal cisterns in the brain. The cisterna magna is labelled as cisterna cerebellomedullaris at the lower right.

Details
- System: Ventricular

Identifiers
- Latin: cisterna magna, cisterna cerebellomedullaris posterior
- MeSH: D002946
- TA98: A14.1.01.208
- TA2: 5402
- FMA: 83721

The cisterna magna (posterior cerebellomedullary cistern, or cerebellomedullary cistern) is the largest of the subarachnoid cisterns. It occupies the space created by the angle between the caudal/inferior surface of the cerebellum, and the dorsal/posterior surface of the medulla oblongata (it is created by the arachnoidea that bridges this angle). The fourth ventricle communicates with the cistern via the unpaired midline median aperture. It is continuous inferiorly with the subarachnoid space of the spinal canal.

The cisterna magna contains the two vertebral arteries, the origins of the two posterior inferior cerebellar arteries, the glossopharyngeal nerve (CN IX), vagus nerve (CN X), accessory nerve (CN XI), hypoglossal nerve (XII), and choroid plexus. The vertebral artery and posterior inferior cerebellar artery of either side pass traverse either lateral portion of the cistern.

== Etymology ==
The Terminologia Anatomica classifies the terms cisterna magna and posterior cerebellomedullary cistern as synonyms. It does not recognise the term "cerebellomedullary cistern" (neither as a synonym or distinct structure) but acknowledges the lateral cerebellomedullary cistern as a distinct structure.

The 42nd edition of Gray's Anatomy (2020) and 12th edition of Last's Anatomy (2011) recognise the cisterna magna and cerebellomedullary cistern as synonyms, and do not describe a separate lateral cerebellomedullary cistern.

According to the 8th edition of the Clinical Oriented Anatomy (2018), the cerebellomedullary cistern is subdivided into the posterior cerebellomedullary cistern (cisterna magna), and the lateral cerebellomedullary cistern.

== Clinical significance ==
The cisterna magna may be tapped with a needle inserted superior to the posterior arch of atlas.
