= Medial eminence of floor of fourth ventricle =

Anatomical structure in the brainstem.

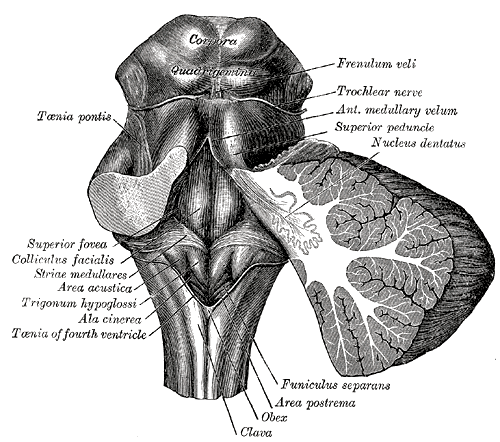
- Rhomboid fossa. (Medial eminence visible but not labeled.)

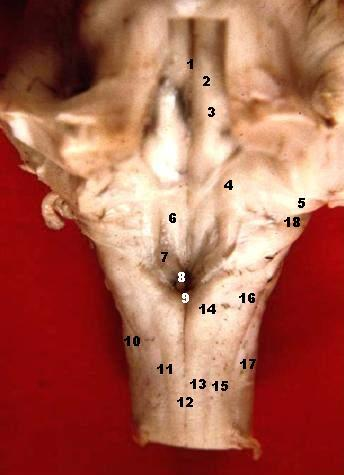
- Human caudal brainstem posterior view description (Eminentia medialis is #2)

Details

Identifiers
- Latin: eminentia medialis fossae rhomboideae
- NeuroNames: 1922
- TA98: A14.1.05.704
- FMA: 78479

In the human brain, the rhomboid fossa is divided into symmetrical halves by a median sulcus which reaches from the upper to the lower angles of the fossa and is deeper below than above. On either side of this sulcus is an elevation, the medial eminence, bounded laterally by a sulcus, the sulcus limitans.

In the superior part of the fossa the medial eminence has a width equal to that of the corresponding half of the fossa, but opposite the superior fovea it forms an elongated swelling, the colliculus facialis, which overlies the nucleus of the abducent nerve, and is, in part at least, produced by the internal genu of the facial nerve.
