= Ependymin =

Glycoprotein

Ependymin Related 1
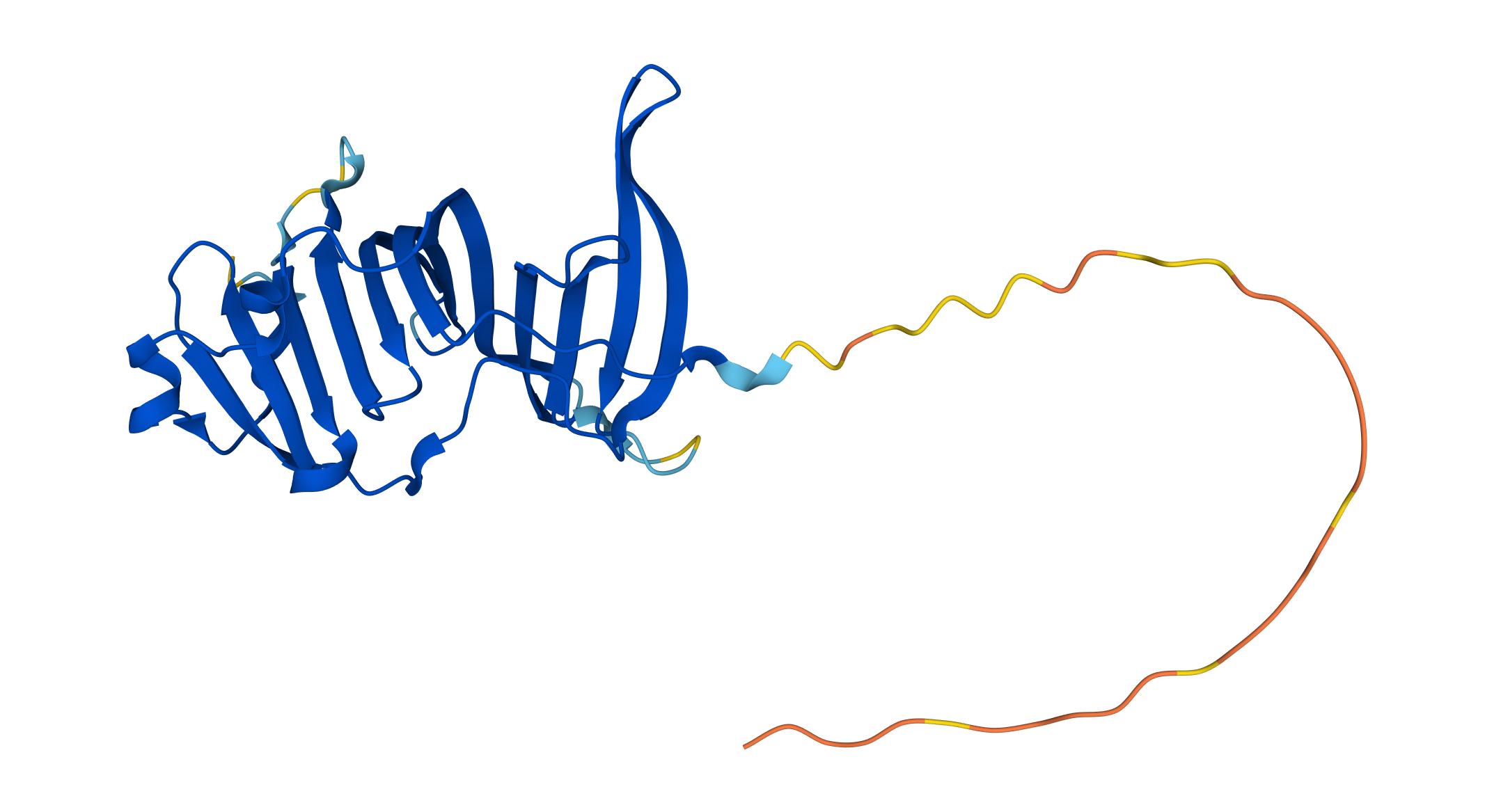

Identifiers
- Symbol: EPDR1
- Alt. symbols: EPDR, MERP1, UCC1
- Alt. names: Mammalian Ependymin-Related Protein 1, Upregulated In Colorectal Cancer Gene 1 Protein
- NCBI gene: 54749
- HGNC: 17572
- OMIM: 619734
- RefSeq: NM_017549.5
- UniProt: Q9UM22

Other data
- Locus: Chr. 7 p14.1
- Wikidata: Q18041226
Search for
- Structures: Swiss-model
- Domains: InterPro

Ependymin is a glycoprotein found in the cerebrospinal fluid of many teleost fish. The humans homolog is called ependymin related 1 that is encoded by the EPDR1 gene.

Ependymin is associated with the consolidation of long-term memory, possibly providing protection from strokes, and contributing to neuronal regeneration. This encoded protein was originally detected in elevated amounts of fluid within the central nervous system of teleost fishes. Along with long-term memory and neuronal regeneration, ependymin has been connected to specific aspects of changes in signaling within nerve cells leading to brain plasticity, as well as behavioral performance in response to environment stress in fishes. For example, this glycoprotein interaction in the extracellular matrix influences cell adhesion and migration processes in the central nervous system of teleost fishes. The presence of ependymin-related proteins can be found in both vertebrates and invertebrates. They have variety of functional roles in non-neural sites of organisms. For example, an ependymin-related gene that is upregulated in colon cancer known as UCC1 was found in human colorectal tumor cells.
