= Medullary striae of fourth ventricle =

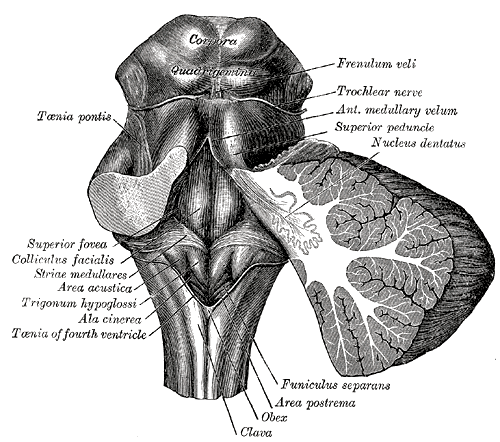
- Rhomboid fossa (striae medullares labeled at center left)

Details

Identifiers
- Latin: striae medullares ventriculi quarti
- TA98: A14.1.05.318; A14.1.05.707
- TA2: 6046
- FMA: 78484

Medullary striae of fourth ventricle are a landmark of the rhomboid fossa - the floor of the fourth ventricle. They are part of the auditory system. The medullary striae are formed by crossed-over anterior internal arcuate fibers - efferents of the arcuate nucleus of medulla oblongata - as they pass laterally beneath the ependyma of the fourth ventricle to reach the contralateral cerebellum. The striae pass over the dorsal aspect of the medial vestibular nucleus.

The medullary striae delineate the boundary between the pons and medulla oblongata dorsally/posteriorly.

== Additional images ==
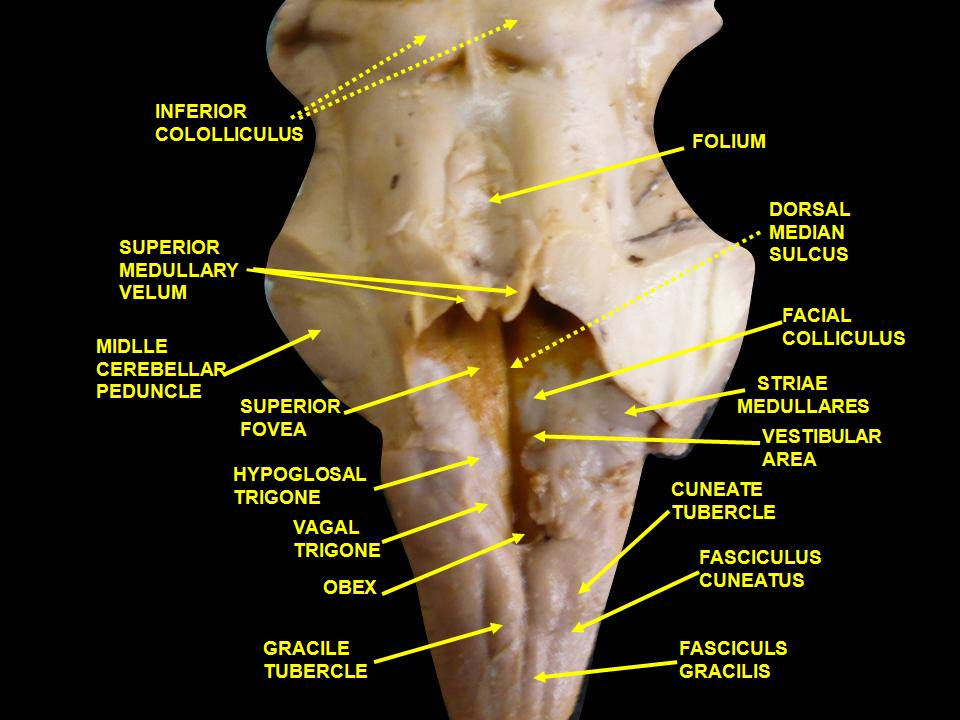
Fourth ventricle. Posterior view. Deep dissection.
