= Cerebral aqueduct =

Conduit for CSF to the brain

- Section through superior colliculus showing path of oculomotor nerve.

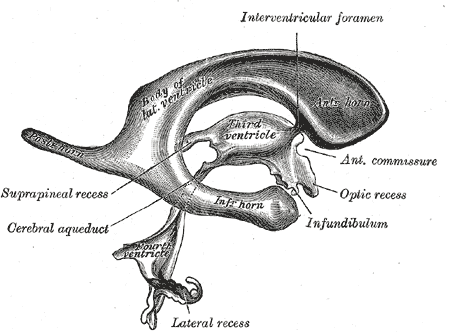
- Drawing of a cast of the ventricular cavities, viewed from the side.

Details
- Part of: Ventricular system

Identifiers
- Latin: aqueductus mesencephali (cerebri) aqueductus Sylvii
- MeSH: D002535
- NeuroNames: 509
- NeuroLex ID: birnlex_1261
- TA98: A14.1.06.501
- TA2: 5910
- FMA: 78467

The cerebral aqueduct (aqueduct of the midbrain, aqueduct of Sylvius, Sylvian aqueduct, mesencephalic duct) is a small, narrow tube connecting the third and fourth ventricles of the brain. The cerebral aqueduct is a midline structure that passes through the midbrain. It extends rostrocaudally through the entirety of the more posterior part of the midbrain. It is surrounded by the periaqueductal gray (central gray), a layer of gray matter.

Congenital stenosis of the cerebral aqueduct is a cause of congenital hydrocephalus.

It is named for Franciscus Sylvius.

== Anatomy ==
The cerebral aqueduct is roughly circular in transverse section, and measures 1-2 mm in diameter. It is 15 mm long and is commonly subdivided into a pars anterior antrum, and pars posterior.

=== Relations ===
Rostrally, it is continuous with the third ventricle, commencing just inferior to the posterior commissure.

Caudally, it is continuous with the fourth ventricle at the junction of the mesencephalon and pons.

The midbrain tegmentum is situated anteriorly to the cerebral aqueduct. The portion of the tegmentum posterior to the aqueduct is the tectum. The superior and inferior colliculi that make up the corpora quadrigemina are situated posteriorly to it.

=== Development ===
The cerebral aqueduct, as other parts of the ventricular system of the brain, develops from the central canal of the neural tube, and it originates from the portion of the neural tube that is present in the developing mesencephalon, hence the name "mesencephalic duct."

== Function ==
The cerebral aqueduct acts as a canal that passes through the midbrain. It connects the third ventricle with the fourth ventricle so that cerebrospinal fluid (CSF) moves between the cerebral ventricles and the canal connecting these ventricles.

== Clinical significance ==
Aqueductal stenosis, a narrowing of the cerebral aqueduct, obstructs the flow of CSF and has been associated with non-communicating hydrocephalus. Such narrowing can be congenital, arise via tumor compression (e.g. pinealoblastoma), or through cyclical gliosis secondary to an initial partial obstruction.

== History ==
The cerebral aqueduct was first named after Franciscus Sylvius.

== Additional images ==
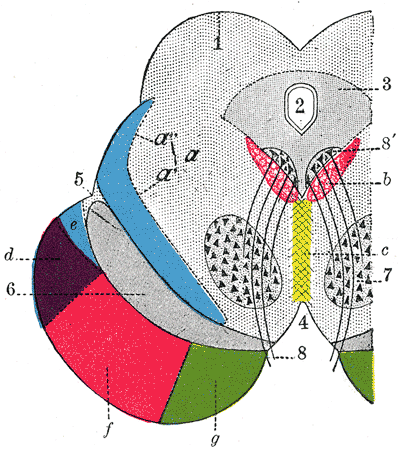
Transverse section through mid-brain; number 2 indicates the cerebral aqueduct.

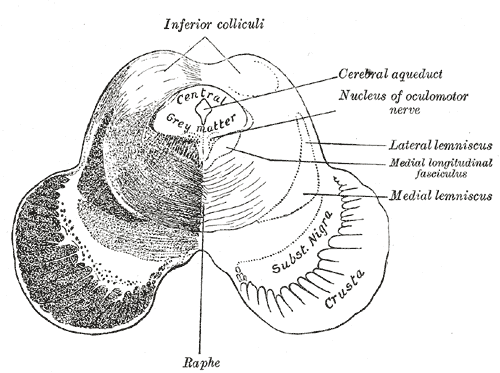
Transverse section of mid-brain at level of inferior colliculi.

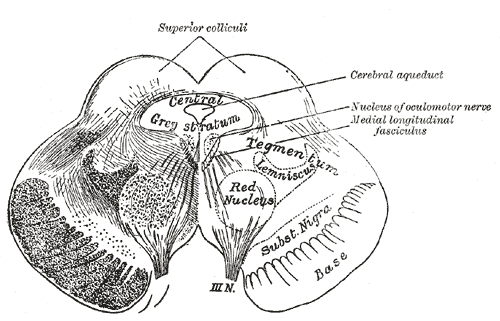
Transverse section of mid-brain at level of superior colliculi.

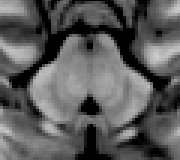
MRI section of mid-brain.

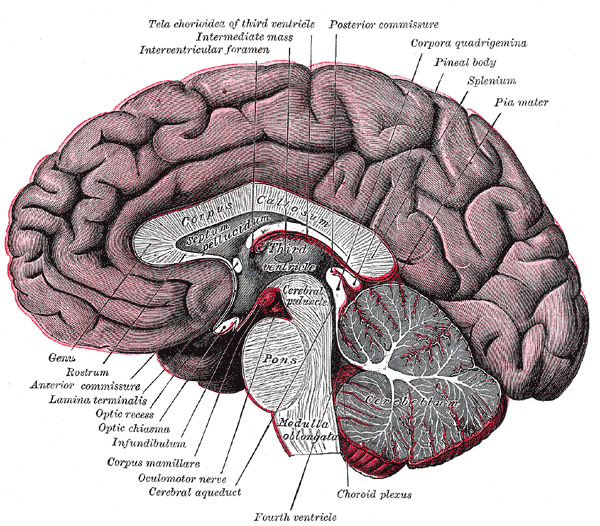
Median sagittal section of brain.

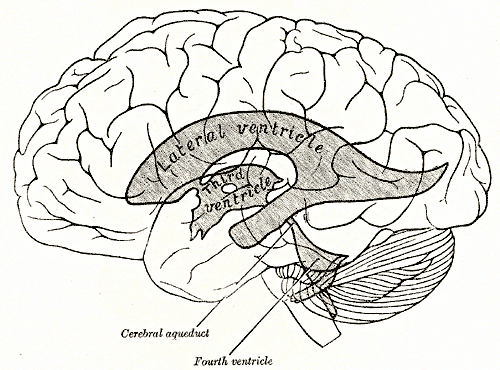
Scheme showing relations of the ventricles to the surface of the brain.

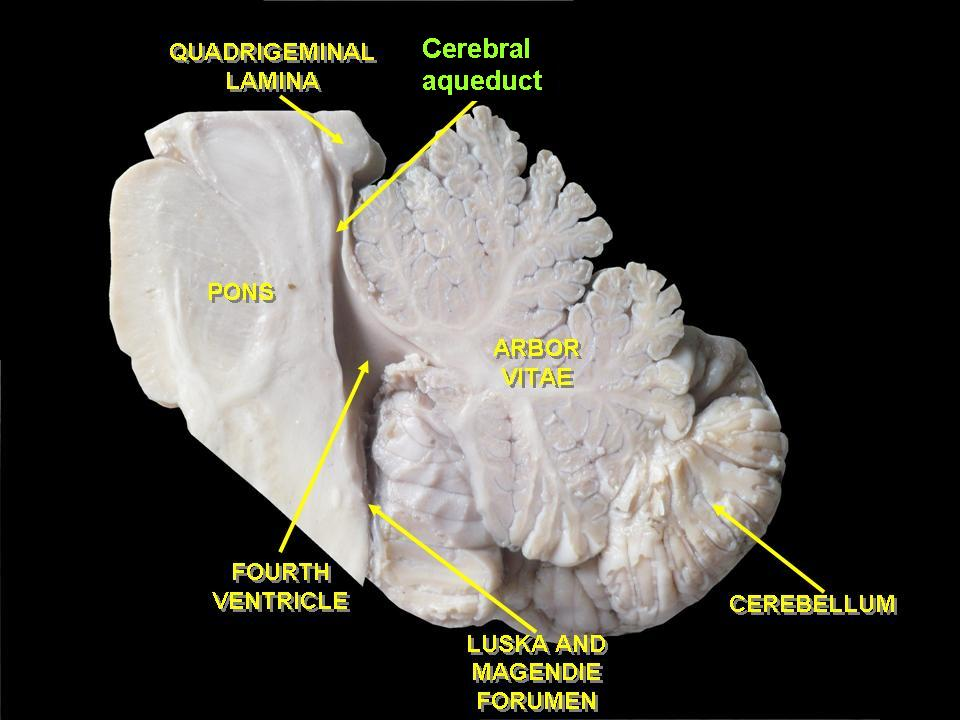
Cerebral aqueduct

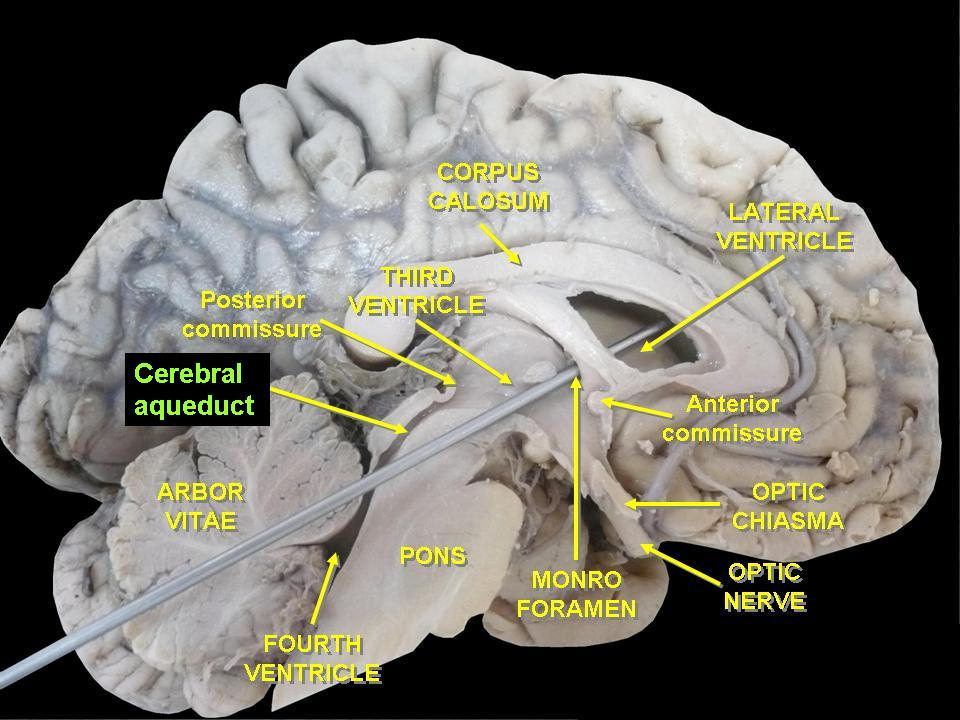
Cerebral aqueduct

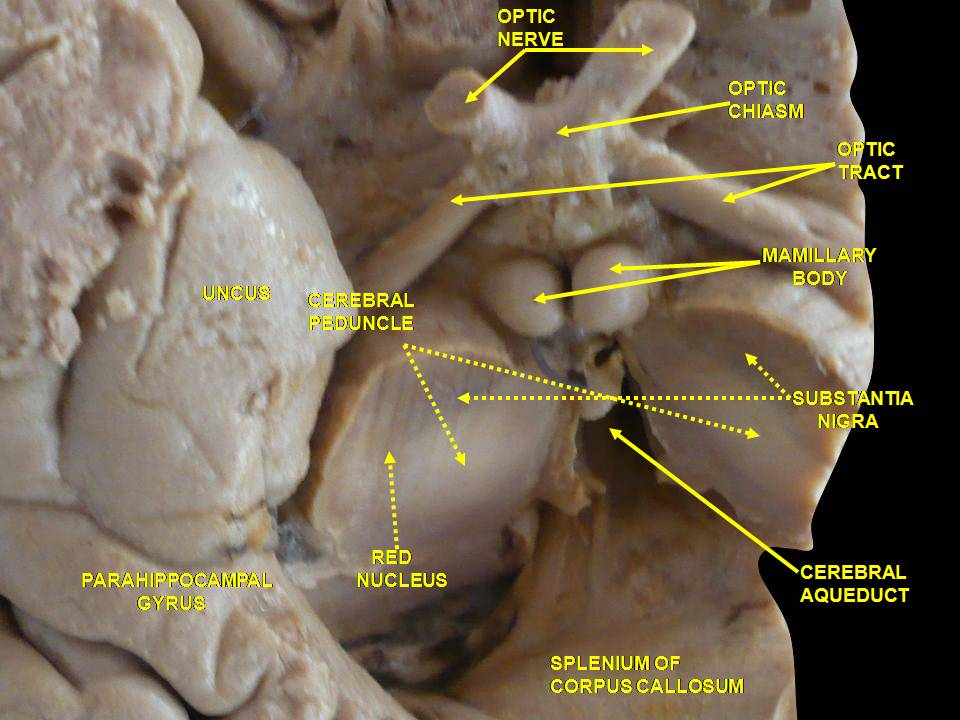
Cerebral peduncle, optic chasm, cerebral aqueduct. Inferior view. Deep dissection.

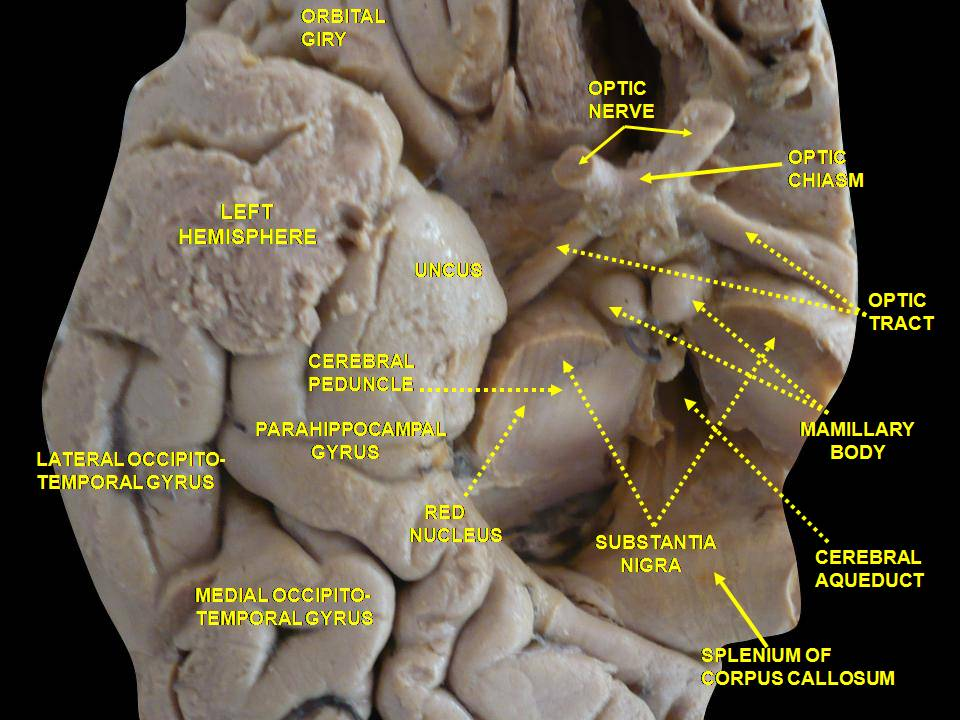
Cerebral peduncle, optic chasm, cerebral aqueduct. Inferior view. Deep dissection.

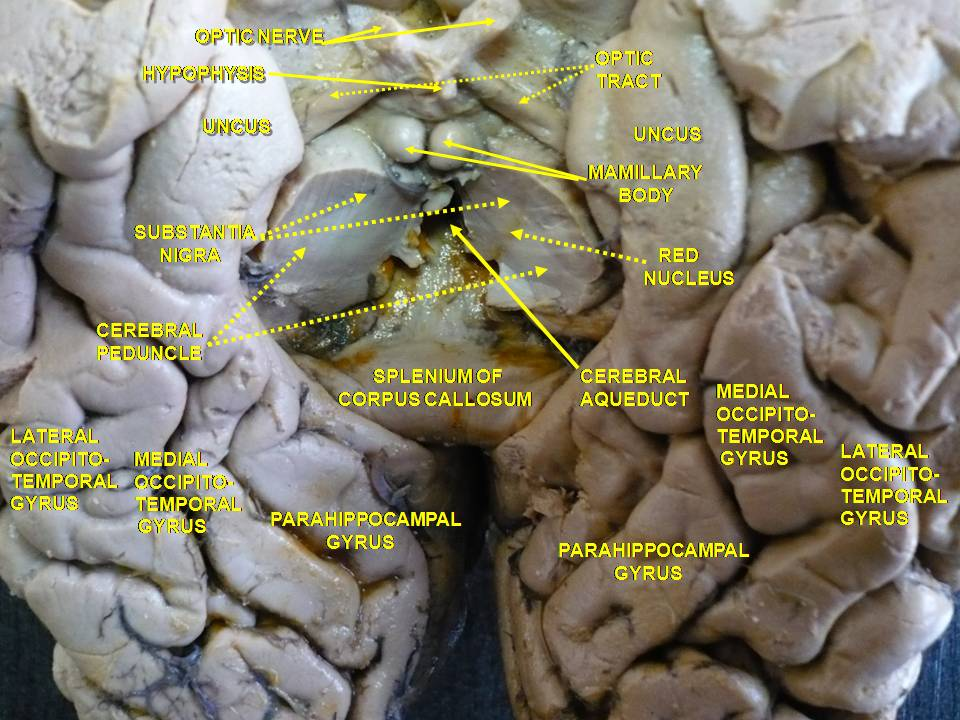
Cerebrum. Inferior view. Deep dissection

== See also ==
- List of regions in the human brain
