= Hypoglossal trigone =

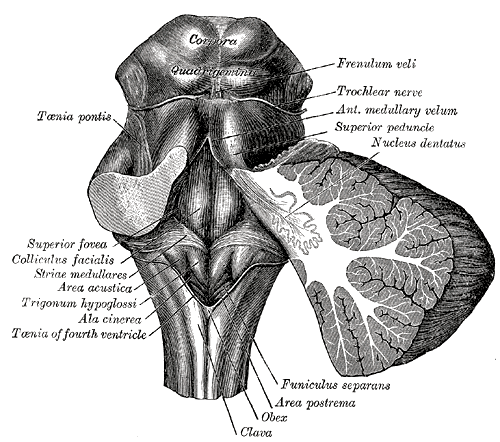
- Rhomboid fossa. (Trigonum hypoglossi labeled at center left.)

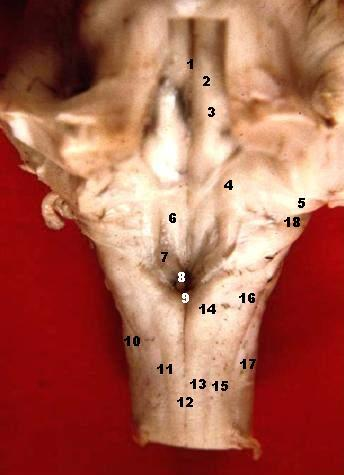
- Human caudal brainstem posterior view description (trigonum nervi hypoglossi is #6)

Details

Identifiers
- Latin: trigonum nervi hypoglossi
- NeuroNames: 635
- TA98: A14.1.05.708
- FMA: 78489

In the upper part of the medulla oblongata, the hypoglossal nucleus approaches the rhomboid fossa, where it lies close to the middle line, under an eminence named the hypoglossal trigone. It is a slight elevation in the floor of the inferior recess of the fourth ventricle, beneath which is the nucleus of origin of the twelfth cranial nerve.
