= Obex =

Location in the brain joining the fourth ventricle and spinal canal

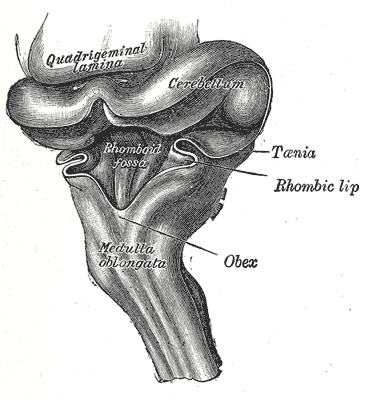
- Hind-brain of a human embryo of three months—viewed from behind and partly from left side.

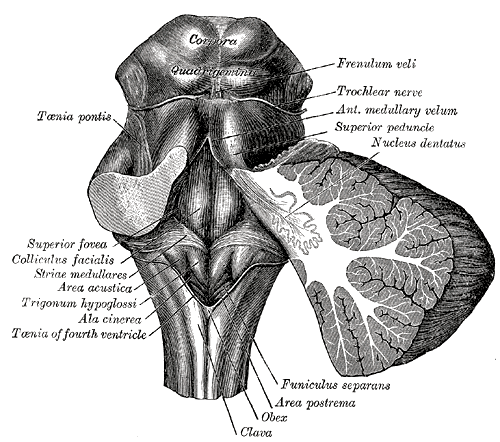
- Rhomboid fossa.

Details

Identifiers
- Latin: obex
- NeuroNames: 636
- NeuroLex ID: nlx_151877
- TA98: A14.1.04.021; A14.1.05.723
- TA2: 5982
- FMA: 78490

The obex (from Latin 'barrier'), also known as calamus scriptorius, is the point in the human brain at which the fourth ventricle narrows to become the central canal of the spinal cord. Cerebrospinal fluid can flow from the fourth ventricle into the obex. In anatomical studies, the obex has been found to occur approximately 10–12 mm above the level of the foramen magnum. In patients with low tonsillar position, the obex has been found at or below the plane of the foramen magnum.

The obex occurs in the caudal medulla.

The decussation of sensory fibers happens at this point.

== Clinical significance ==
Lesions at the location can result in obstructive hydrocephalus. The most common lesion at this location is a subependymoma, a benign tumor. Hemangioblastoma has been observed in this location. Neurological surgical intervention in the treatment of syringomyelia or hydromyelia may involve plugging the obex to prevent the transmission of cerebrospinal fluid to the central canal of the spinal cord. Gardner suggested plugging of obex with muscle prevents transmission of CSF wave into central canal.

== Detection of prions ==
Immunohistochemistry (IHC) to test brain, lymph, and neuroendocrine tissues for the presence of the abnormal prion protein to diagnose wasting diseases like chronic wasting disease in deer. Positive IHC findings in the obex is considered the gold standard.

== Additional images ==
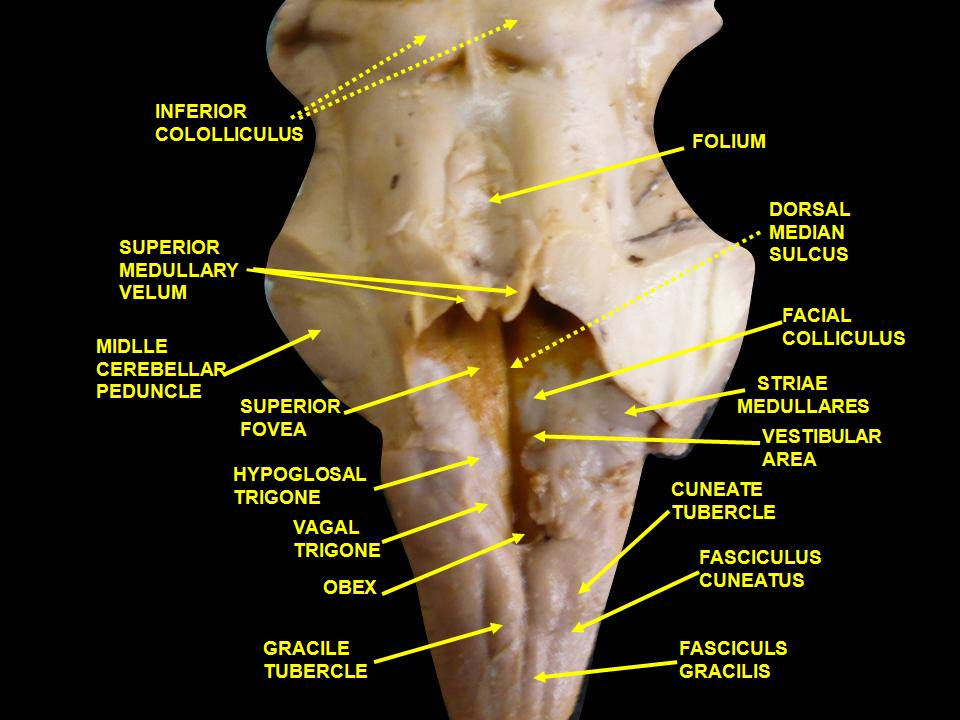
Fourth ventricle. Posterior view. Deep dissection.
