= Frontopontine fibers =

Frontal lobe

- Tractography of frontopontine fibers

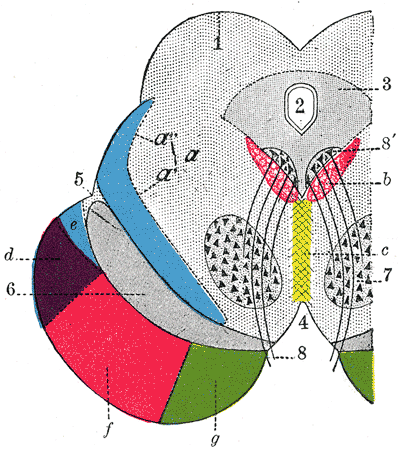
- Coronal section through mid-brain.: 1. Corpora quadrigemina 2. Cerebral aqueduct 3. Central gray stratum 4. Interpeduncular space 5. Sulcus lateralis 6. Substantia nigra 7. Red nucleus of tegmentum 8. Oculomotor nerve, with 8’, its nucleus of origin; 1. Lemniscus (in blue) with a’ the medial lemniscus and a" the lateral lemniscus 2. Medial longitudinal fasciculus 3. Raphé; 4. Temporopontine fibers 5. Portion of medial lemniscus, which runs to the lentiform nucleus and insula 6. Cerebrospinal fibers 7. Frontopontine fibers

Details

Identifiers
- Latin: fibrae frontopontinae
- NeuroNames: 1326

The frontopontine fibers or frontopontine tract are corticopontine fibers projecting from the cortex of the frontal lobe to the pons. In the internal capsule, the fibers descend predominantly in the anterior limb (but some also in the posterior limb), passing inferior to the thalamus to reach the mesencephalon (midbrain) where they descend in the medial portion of base of the cerebral peduncles. In the pons, the fibers flare out between the pontine nuclei.

== Pathways ==
Some of the frontopontine fibers participate in a pathway contributing to horizontal conjugate gaze:

- Visual cortex → frontal eye fields (of the middle frontal gyrus) → frontopontine fibers → (contralateral) paramedian pontine reticular formation → (ipsilateral) abducens nucleus and (contralateral) oculomotor nucleus
