= Ambient cistern =

Details

Identifiers
- Latin: Cisterna ambiens

The ambient cistern is a bilaterally paired (one on each side of the body) subarachnoid cistern situated at either lateral aspect of the mesencephalon (midbrain). Each ambient cistern has a supratentorial compartment and an infratentorial compartment. Each is continuous anteriorly with the interpeduncular cistern, and posteriorly with the quadrigeminal cistern.

== Anatomy ==
Each ambient cistern is situated between (the parahippocampal gyrus and dentate gyrus of) the temporal lobe (laterally), and the lateral aspect of the posterior of the mesencephalon posterior to the cerebral peduncle (medially).

=== Relations ===
Each ambient cistern extends anterolaterally around the mesencephalon to become continuous rostrally/anteriorly with the interpeduncular cistern. Each ambient cistern is continuous dorsally/posteriorly with the quadrigeminal cistern; inversely, each ambient cistern is an anterolateral extension of the quadrigeminal cistern on either side (some sources define the quadrigeminal cistern as part of the ambient cistern).

=== Contents ===
The ambient cisterns contain the trochlear nerve (CN IV), basal vein, a part of the posterior cerebral artery, the superior cerebellar artery.
