= Temporopontine fibers =

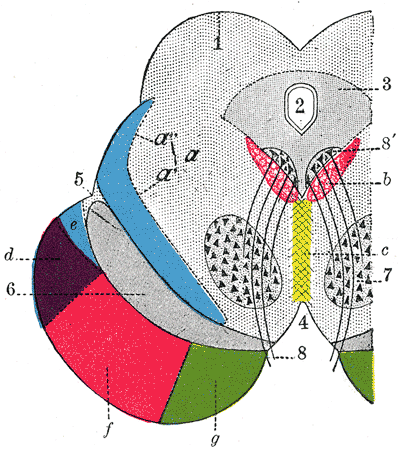
- Coronal section through mid-brain.: 1. Corpora quadrigemina 2. Cerebral aqueduct 3. Central gray stratum 4. Interpeduncular space 5. Sulcus lateralis 6. Substantia nigra 7. Red nucleus of tegmentum 8. Oculomotor nerve, with 8’, its nucleus of origin; 1. Lemniscus (in blue) with a’ the medial lemniscus and a" the lateral lemniscus 2. Medial longitudinal fasciculus 3. Raphé; 4. Temporopontine fibers 5. Portion of medial lemniscus, which runs to the lentiform nucleus and insula 6. Cerebrospinal fibers 7. Frontopontine fibers

Details

Identifiers
- Latin: fibrae temporopontinae
- NeuroNames: 1329

The temporopontine fibers are corticopontine fibers projecting from the temporal lobe to the pontine nuclei. The temporopontine fibers are lateral to the cerebrospinal fibers; they originate in the temporal lobe and end in the pontine nuclei.

The fibers descend through the sublentiform part of the internal capsule.
