= Nuclei colliculi superioris =

Nuclei colliculi superioris are groups of large cells in the middle gray layer of the superior colliculus and more laterally near the midbrain tegmentum.
