= Geniculate fibers =

Fibers in the region of the genu of the internal capsule

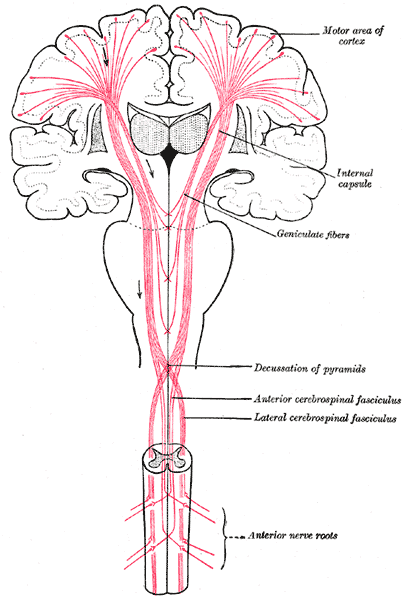
- The motor tract.

The geniculate fibers are the fibers in the region of the genu of the internal capsule; they originate in the motor part of the cerebral cortex, and, after passing downward through the base of the cerebral peduncle with the cerebrospinal fibers, undergo decussation and end in the motor nuclei of the cranial nerves of the opposite side.
