= Friedrich Christian Rosenthal =

German anatomist (1780–1829)

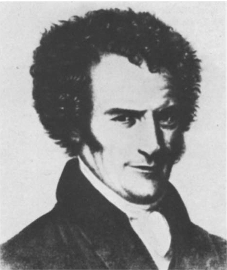
Friedrich Rosenthal (1780–1829)

Friedrich Christian Rosenthal (3 June 1780 – 5 December 1829) was a German anatomist who was a native of Greifswald.

He earned his doctorate from the University of Jena, and later opened a medical practice in Greifswald (1804). In Greifswald he worked closely with naturalist Karl Asmund Rudolphi (1771–1832), earning his habilitation in 1807 from the local university with a treatise on olfaction. In 1810 he accepted an appointment to the University of Berlin, and in 1820 returned to Greifswald as a professor of physiology and anatomy. He died in 1829 at the age of 49 due to consequences from tuberculosis.

Rosenthal is remembered today for two anatomical terms that contain his name:

- Rosenthal's canal, or the spiral canal of the cochlea (canalis spiralis cochleae): A section of the bony labyrinth of the inner ear that is approximately 30 mm long, making 2 3/4 turns about the modiolus.
- Rosenthal's vein, or the cerebral basal vein (vena basalis): a vein that arises at the anterior perforated substance, passes backward and around the cerebral peduncle, joins the internal cerebral veins, forming the vein of Galen before draining into the straight sinus.
