= Perforated substance =

Perforated substance may refer to:

- Anterior perforated substance
- Posterior perforated substance
