= Cerebrospinal fibers =

Derived from the cells of the motor area of the cerebral cortex

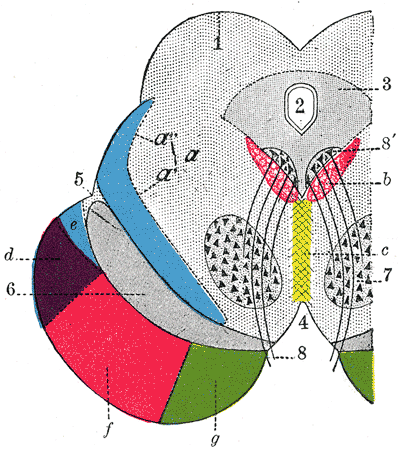
- Coronal section through mid-brain.: 1. Corpora quadrigemina.; 2. Cerebral aqueduct.; 3. Central gray stratum.; 4. Interpeduncular space.; 5. Sulcus lateralis.; 6. Substantia nigra.; 7. Red nucleus of tegmentum.; 8. Oculomotor nerve, with 8’, its nucleus of origin; 1. Lemniscus (in blue) with a’ the medial lemniscus and a" the lateral lemniscus 2. Medial longitudinal fasciculus 3. Raphé; 4. Temporopontine fibers 5. Portion of medial lemniscus, which runs to the lentiform nucleus and insula 6. Cerebrospinal fibers 7. Frontopontine fibers

Details

Identifiers
- Latin: fibrae cerebrospinales

The cerebrospinal fibers, derived from the cells of the motor area of the cerebral cortex, occupy the middle three-fifths of the base; they are continued partly to the nuclei of the motor cranial nerves, but mainly into the pyramids of the medulla oblongata.
