= Lateroventral thalamic vein =

Component of human brain circulatory system

Details
- Drains from: lateral ventral part of the thalamus
- Drains to: basal vein

Identifiers
- Latin: v. latero-ventrales thalami

The (bilaterally paired) lateroventral thalamic vein originates from the lateral ventral part of the corresponding half of the thalamus.

The thalamus drains into the internal cerebral veins and the basal veins of Rosenthal through the deep cerebral venous system.
