= Laterocaudal thalamic vein =

Laterocaudal thalamic veins (left and right)

Details
- Drains from: lateral caudal part of the thalamus
- Drains to: basal vein

Identifiers
- Latin: venae latero-caudales thalami dextra et sinistra

The paired (right and left) laterocaudal thalamic veins (Latin: venae latero-caudales thalami dextra et sinistra) originate each from the lateral caudal part of the corresponding half of the thalamus. Benno Shlesinger in 1976 classified these veins as belonging to the lateral group of thalamic veins (venae laterales thalami).
