= Cistern of lamina terminalis =

Details

Identifiers
- Latin: cisterna laminae terminalis
- NeuroNames: 29
- TA98: A14.1.01.216
- TA2: 5395
- FMA: 74516

The cistern of lamina terminalis is one of the subarachnoid cisterns. It is situated (depending upon the source) either superior to the lamina terminalis, or rostral/anterior to the lamina terminalis and anterior commissure between the two frontal lobes of the cerebrum. It is situated rostral/anterior to the third ventricle. The cistern is an extension of interpeduncular cistern. The cistern of lamina terminalis interconnects the chiasmatic cistern and pericallosal cistern.

The cistern contains the anterior cerebral arteries, the anterior communicating artery, hypothalamic artery, the origin of the fronto-orbital arteries, and Heubner's artery.

== See also ==
- Terminal cisterna
