= Interpeduncular fossa =

Brain segment

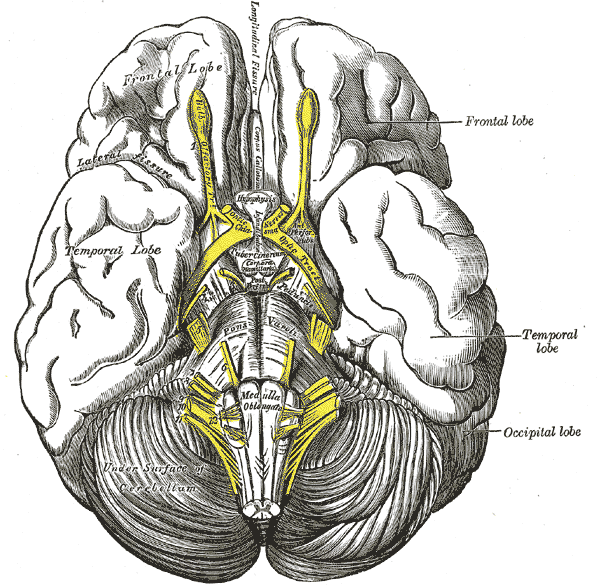
- Base of brain

- Section through superior colliculus showing path of oculomotor nerve (interpeduncular fossa not labeled, but visible at bottom center)

Details

Identifiers
- Latin: fossa interpeduncularis
- NeuroNames: 489

The interpeduncular fossa is a deep depression of the ventral surface of the midbrain between the two cerebal crura. It has been found in humans and macaques, but not in rats or mice, showing that this is a relatively new evolutionary region.

== Structure ==
The interpeduncular fossa is a somewhat rhomboid-shaped area of the base of the brain.

=== Features ===
The lateral wall of the interpeduncular fossa bears a groove - the oculomotor sulcus - from which rootlets of the oculomotor nerve emerge from the substance of the brainstem and aggregate into a single fascicle.

=== Anatomical relations ===
The ventral tegmental area lies at the depth of the interpeduncular fossa.

==== Boundaries ====
The interpeduncular fossa is bounded in front by the optic chiasma, behind by the antero-superior surface of the pons, antero-laterally by the converging optic tracts, and postero-laterally by the diverging cerebral peduncles.

The floor of interpeduncular fossa, from posterior to anterior, are the posterior perforated substance, corpora mamillaria, tuber cinereum, infundibulum, and pituitary gland.

==== Contents ====
Contents of interpeduncular fossa include oculomotor nerve, and circle of Willis.

The basal veins pass alongside the interpeduncular fossa before joining the great cerebral vein.

== Clinical significance ==
The most common locations for neurocutaneous melanosis have occurred along the interpeduncular fossa, ventral brainstem, upper cervical cord, and ventral lumbosacral cord.

== See also ==
- Interpeduncular cistern
- Cerebral peduncles

== Additional images ==
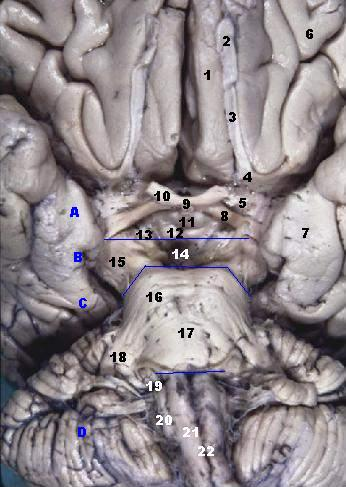
Human brainstem anterior view

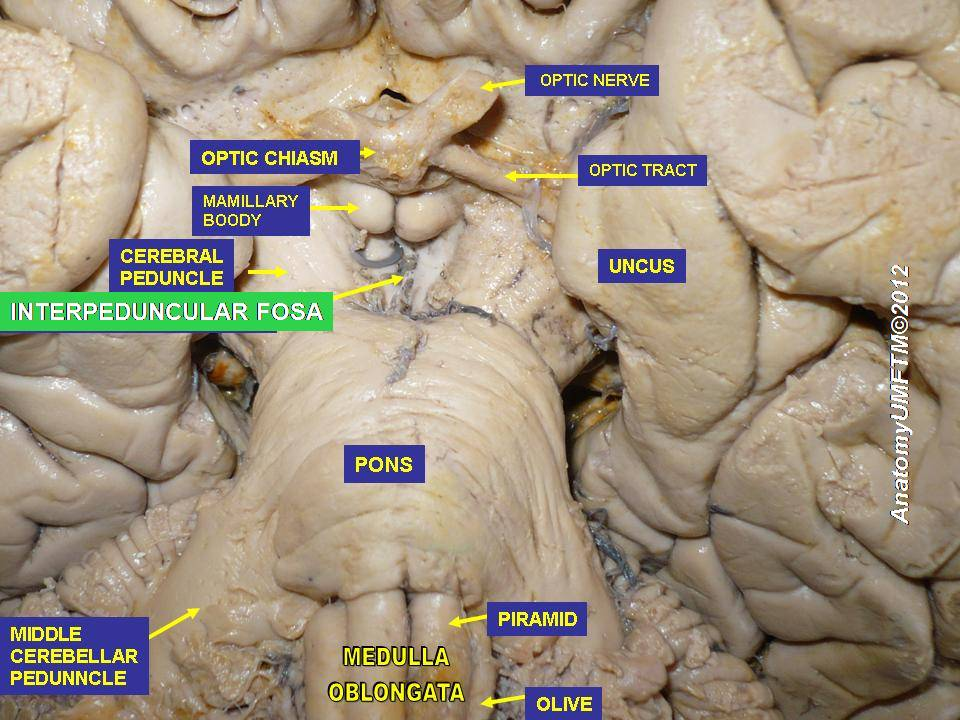
Interpeduncular fossa. Cerebrum. Deep dissection. Inferior dissection.
