= Global aphasia =

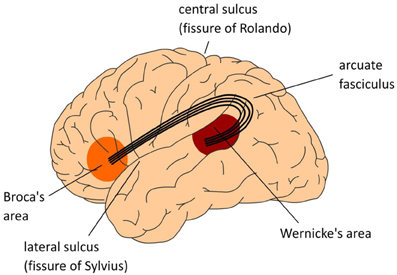
- Global aphasia occurs due to a lesion in the perisylvian cortex, including Broca's and Wernike's areas.

Global aphasia is a severe form of nonfluent aphasia, caused by damage to the left side of the brain, that affects receptive and expressive language skills (needed for both written and oral language) as well as auditory and visual comprehension. Acquired impairments of communicative abilities are present across all language modalities, impacting language production, comprehension, and repetition. Patients with global aphasia may be able to verbalize a few short utterances and use non-word neologisms, but their overall production ability is limited. Their ability to repeat words, utterances, or phrases is also affected. Due to the preservation of the right hemisphere, an individual with global aphasia may still be able to express themselves through facial expressions, gestures, and intonation. This type of aphasia often results from a large lesion of the left perisylvian cortex. The lesion is caused by an occlusion of the left middle cerebral artery and is associated with damage to Broca's area, Wernicke's area, and insular regions which are associated with aspects of language.

== Signs and symptoms ==
It is most common for the onset of global aphasia to occur after a thrombotic stroke (at the trunk of the middle cerebral artery), with varying severity. The general signs and symptoms include the inability to understand, create, and repeat speech and language. These difficulties also persist in reading, writing, and auditory comprehension abilities. Verbal language typically consists of a few recognizable utterances and words (e.g., hello), overlearned phrases (e.g., how are you), and expletives (e.g., a curse word). However, those affected by global aphasia may express themselves using facial expressions, intonation, and gestures. Extensive lexical (vocabulary) impairment is possible, resulting in an inability to read simple words or sentences. Global aphasia may be accompanied by weakness of the right side of the face and right hemiplegia (paralysis), but can occur with or without hemiparesis (weakness). Additionally, it is common for an individual with global aphasia to have one or more of the following additional impairments: apraxia of speech, alexia, pure word deafness, agraphia, facial apraxia, and depression.

Persons with global aphasia are socially appropriate, usually attentive, and task-oriented. Some are able to respond to yes/no questions, but responses are more reliable when questions refer to family and personal experiences. Automatic speech is preserved with normal phonemic, phonetic and inflectional structures. Right hemiparesis or hemiplegia, right-sided sensory loss, and right homonymous hemianopsia may manifest as well. Persons with global aphasia may recognize location names and common objects' names (single-words), while rejecting pseudo-words and real but incorrect names.

== Causes ==
Global aphasia typically results from an occlusion to the trunk of the middle cerebral artery (MCA), which affects a large portion of the perisylvian region of the left cortex. Global aphasia is usually a result of a thrombotic stroke, which occurs when a blood clot forms in the brain's blood vessels. In addition to stroke, global aphasia can also be caused by traumatic brain injury (TBI), tumors, and progressive neurological disorders. The large areas in the anterior (Broca's) and posterior (Wernicke's) area of the brain are either destroyed or impaired because they are separate branches of the MCA that are supplied by its arterial trunk. Lesions usually result in extensive damage to the language areas of the left hemisphere, however global aphasia can result from damage to smaller, subcortical regions. It is well known that a lesion to the cortex can cause aphasia. However, a study by Kumar et al. (1996) suggests that lesions to the subcortical regions of the cortex such as the thalamus, basal ganglia, internal capsule, and paraventricular white matter can also cause speech and language deficits. This is due to the fact that the subcortical regions are closely associated with the language centers in the brain. Kumar et al. state that while lesions to the subcortical regions could cause certain types of aphasia, a lesion to these regions would rarely cause global aphasia. In a study performed by Ferro (1992), it was found that five different brain lesion locations were linked to aphasia. These locations include: "fronto-temporo-parietal lesions", "anterior, suprasylvian, frontal lesions", "large subcortical infarcts", "posterior, suprasylvian, parietal infarcts", and "a double lesion composed of a frontal and a temporal infarct".

== Diagnosis ==
If a suspected brain injury has occurred, the patient undergoes a series of medical imaging, which could include MRI (magnetic resonance imaging) or CT (computed tomography) scan. After the diagnosis of a brain injury, a speech and language pathologist will perform a variety of tests to determine the classification of aphasia. Additionally, the Boston Assessment of Severe Aphasia (BASA) is a commonly used assessment for diagnosing aphasia. BASA is used to determine treatment plans after strokes lead to symptoms of aphasia and tests both gestural and verbal responses. Cognitive functions can be assessed using the Cognitive Test Battery for Global Aphasia (CoBaGa). The CoBaGa is an appropriate measure to assess a person with severe aphasia because it does not require verbal responses, rather manipulative answers. The CoBaGa assesses cognitive functions such as attention, executive functions, logical reasoning, memory, visual-auditory recognition, and visual-spatial ability. Van Mourik et al. conducted a study in which they assessed the cognitive abilities of people with global aphasia using the Global Aphasic Neuropsychological Battery. This test assesses attention/concentration, memory, intelligence, and visual and auditory nonverbal recognition. The results of this study helped the researchers determine there were varying levels of severity among individuals with global aphasia.

== Treatment ==
Speech and language therapy is typically the primary treatment for individuals with aphasia. The goal of speech and language therapy is to increase the person's communication abilities to a level functional for daily life. Goals are chosen based on collaboration between speech language pathologists, patients, and their family/caregivers. Goals should be individualized based on the person's aphasia symptoms and communicative needs. In 2016, Wallace et al. found the following outcomes were commonly prioritized in therapy: communication, life participation, physical and emotional well-being, normalcy, and health and support services. However, available research is inconclusive about which specific approach to speech and language therapy is most effective in treating global aphasia.

Therapy can be either group or individual. Group therapies that integrate the use of visual aids allow for enhanced social and communication-skill development. Group therapy sessions typically revolve around simple, preplanned activities or games, and aim to facilitate social communication.

One particular therapy designed specifically for treatment of aphasia is Visual Action Therapy (VAT). VAT is a non-verbal gestural output program with 3 phases and 30 total steps. The program teaches unilateral gestures as symbolic representations of real life objects. Research on the effectiveness of VAT is limited and inconclusive.

One important therapy technique includes teaching family members and caregivers strategies for more effectively communicating with their loved ones. Research offers such strategies including, simplifying sentences and using common words, gaining the person's attention before speaking, using pointing and visual cues, allowing for adequate response time, and creating a quiet environment free of distractions.

Research supporting the efficacy of pharmacological treatments for aphasia is limited. To date, no large scale clinical trials have proven benefits of pharmacological treatment.

== Prognosis ==
When evaluating the prognosis of a patient, the main contributing participant factors that influence the extent of neuroplasticity, or the brain's ability to change are: age, lesion location, pre-existing cognitive status, motivation, overall health, and interaction amongst these. After brain damage, initial signs of global aphasia may appear within the first two days due to brain swelling (cerebral edema). With some time and natural recovery, impairment presentation may progress into expressive aphasia (most commonly) or receptive aphasia. Due to the size and location of the lesion associated with global aphasia, the prognosis for language abilities is poor. Research has shown that the prognosis of long-term language abilities is determined by the initial severity level of aphasia within the first four weeks after a stroke. As a result, there is a poor prognosis for persons who retain a diagnosis of aphasia after one month due to limited initial language abilities. Nonetheless, in the first year post-stroke, patients with global aphasia showed improvement in their Western Aphasia Battery (WAB) scores from baseline. When compared to individuals with Broca's, Wernicke's, anomic, and conduction types of aphasia, those with Broca's aphasia showed the best rate and extent of improvement followed by global aphasia. The rate of improvement in language function was highest in the first four weeks after stroke.

Although the prognosis for persons diagnosed with global aphasia is poor, improvement in varying aspects of language is possible. For example, in 1992, Ferro performed research in which he studied the recovery of individuals with acute global aphasia, resulting from the five different lesion sites. The first lesion site was in the fronto-tempo-parietal region of the brain; patients with lesions in this location saw the least amount of gains out of all of the participants in the study, and they often never recovered from global aphasia. However, the second lesion site was the anterior, suprasylvian, frontal part of the brain; the third lesion site was the subcortical infarcts; and the fourth lesion site was the posterior, suprasylvian, parietal infarcts. Participants with lesions two, three, and four often recovered to a less severe form of aphasia, such as Broca's or transcortical. The fifth lesion site was a double lesion in both the frontal and temporal infarcts; patients with lesions at this site showed slight improvement. However, studies show that spontaneous improvement, if it happens, occurs within six months, but complete recovery is rare.

Studies have shown that persons with global aphasia have improved their verbal and nonverbal speech and language skills through speech and language therapy. One study examined the recovery of a group of individuals who were classified as having global aphasia at 3 months poststroke. The individuals received intensive speech and language intervention. The results of the study illustrated that all of the patients showed improvement. The greatest area of improvement was in auditory comprehension, and the least in the use of propositional speech. After 6 months poststroke, the individuals showed an increased use of gestures to communicate, as their communication skills remained severely impaired.

During therapy, most progress is seen within the first 3 years, but it is possible for language abilities to continuously improve at a steady rate due to long-term intensive language intervention. While improvement in language abilities is possible with intervention, only 20 percent of persons diagnosed with global aphasia achieve functional use of language. Communication of basic needs and the comprehension of simple conversations on highly familiar topics, are examples of common functional language use for this population.
