= Anterior nucleus =

Anterior nucleus may refer to:

- Anterior hypothalamic nucleus
- Anterior nuclei of thalamus
