= Thalamogeniculate vein =

Major veins in human body

Thalamogeniculate veins

Details
- Drains from: posterior part of the thalamus, its pulvinar, medial, and lateral geniculate bodies
- Drains to: basal vein
- Artery: thalamogeniculate artery

Identifiers
- Latin: venae thalamo-geniculatae dextra et sinistra

The paired (right and left) thalamogeniculate veins (Latin: venae thalamo-geniculatae dextra et sinistra) originate each from the posterior part of the thalamus. Their course roughly corresponds to the course of the corresponding thalamogeniculate artery on this side. They drain blood from the pulvinar, medial and lateral geniculate bodies. Benno Shlesinger in 1976 classified these veins as belonging to the central group of thalamic veins (venae centrales thalami).
