= Chiasmatic =

Chiasmatic may refer to:

- Chiasmatic cistern
- Chiasmatic groove
