= Pericallosal cistern =

The pericallosal cistern is one of the subarachnoid cisterns. It is situated atop the corpus callosum, extending from its splenium (rostrally/anteriorly) to its genu (caudally/posteriorly).

Rostrally, it communicates with the cistern of lamina terminalis (which in turn communicates with the chiasmatic cistern).
