= Anterior choroidal artery =

- Diagram of the arterial circulation at the base of the brain (inferior view). The anterior choroidal artery is labeled at right of the circle of Willis.

Details
- Source: Internal carotid artery

Identifiers
- Latin: arteria choroidea anterior
- TA98: A12.2.06.019
- TA2: 4501
- FMA: 50087

The anterior choroidal artery is a bilaterally paired artery of the brain. It is typically a branch of the internal carotid artery which supplies the choroid plexus of lateral ventricle and third ventricle as well as numerous structures of the brain.

Occlusion of the artery can result in loss of sensation, loss of part of the visual field, and impaired movement, all on the opposite side of the body as the occlusion.

== Structure ==
=== Origin ===
The anterior choroidal artery typically originates from the internal carotid artery. It may (rarely) instead arise from the middle cerebral artery.

It originates from the distal internal carotid artery (ICA) 5 mm distal to the origin of the posterior communicating artery and just proximal to the terminal bifurcation of the ICA.

=== Course ===
It initially course posterolaterally on the inferior surface of the cerebral hemisphere alongside the optic tract, crossing the tract medial-to-lateral inferior to the tract. At the level of the lateral geniculate nucleus, it curves around the lateral aspect of the cerebral peduncle to reach its posterior aspect. It reaches the medial portion of the transverse cerebral fissure to enter the lateral ventricle. It enters the lateral ventricle at the apex of its inferior horn, at the inferior extremity of choroid fissure, just superior to the uncus.

=== Distribution ===
It serves structures in the prosencephalon, diencephalon, and mesencephalon:

- choroid plexus of the lateral ventricle and third ventricle
- optic chiasm and optic tract
- (genu, posterior limb, and retrolentiform part of) internal capsule
- lateral geniculate body
- globus pallidus
- tail of the caudate nucleus
- (tuber cinereum of) hippocampus
- amygdala
- substantia nigra
- red nucleus
- crus cerebri

== Clinical significance ==
Occlusion of the artery results in contralateral hemianopsia (partial loss of vision) and hemianaesthesia (loss of sensation), as well as partial hemiplegia (loss of the ability to move). These symptoms are thought to arise from ischemic damage to the posterior limb of the internal capsule, thalamus, and optic chiasm/optic tract. However, the posterior limb of the internal capsule also receives lenticulostriate arteries from the middle cerebral artery, thus creating partially redundant supply.

== See also ==
- Plexal point
