= Inferior pulvinary vein =

Inferior pulvinary veins (right and left)

Details
- Drains from: inferior portion of the corresponding half of the pulvinar of the thalamus
- Drains to: basal vein

Identifiers
- Latin: venae pulvinares inferiores dextra et sinistra

The paired (right and left) inferior pulvinary veins (Latin: venae pulvinares inferiores dextra et sinistra) are veins that drain blood from the corresponding halves of inferior part of the pulvinar of the thalamus into the corresponding basal vein.
