= Friedrich Christian =

Friedrich Christian may refer to:

- August Friedrich Christian Vilmar (1800–1868), German Neo-Lutheran theologian
- Carl Friedrich Christian Fasch (1736–1800), German composer and harpsichordist
- Carl Friedrich Christian Mohs (1773–1839), German geologist and mineralogist
- Frederick Christian II, Duke of Schleswig-Holstein-Sonderburg-Augustenburg (1765–1814), Danish prince and feudal magnate
- Friedrich Christian Anton Lang (1890–1976), German-Austrian filmmaker
- Friedrich Christian Baumeister (1709–1785), German philosopher
- Friedrich Christian Bressand (c. 1670 – 1699), Baroque German poet
- Friedrich Christian Delius (born 1943), German writer
- Friedrich Christian Diez (1794–1876), German philologist
- Friedrich Christian Flick (born 1944), German-Swiss art collector
- Friedrich Christian Glume (1714–1752), German artist
- Friedrich Christian Gregor Wernekinck (1798–1835), German anatomist
- Friedrich Christian Hermann Uber (1781–1822), German composer
- Friedrich Christian Laukhard (1757–1822), German novelist, philosopher, historian and theologian
- Friedrich Christian Meuschen (1719–1811), German diplomat
- Friedrich Christian Rosenthal (1780–1829), German anatomist
- Friedrich Christian Weber (18th century), German diplomat and writer
- Friedrich Christian, Count of Schaumburg-Lippe (1655–1728), second ruler of the County of Schaumburg-Lippe
- Friedrich Christian, Margrave of Meissen (1893–1968), head of the Royal House of Saxony

== See also ==
- Christian Friedrich (disambiguation)
