= Subarachnoid cisterns =

Spaces around the brain filled with cerebrospinal fluid

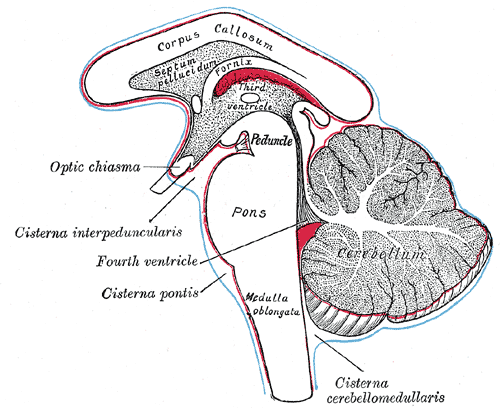
- Diagram showing the positions of the three principal subarachnoid cisterns, cisterna magna is shown as cisterna cerebellomedullaris

Details

Identifiers
- Latin: cisternae subarachnoideum

The subarachnoid cisterns are spaces formed by openings in the subarachnoid space, an anatomic space in the meninges of the brain. The space is situated between the two meninges, the arachnoid mater and the pia mater. These cisterns are filled with cerebrospinal fluid (CSF).

== Structure ==
Although the pia mater adheres to the surface of the brain, closely following the contours of its gyri and sulci, the arachnoid mater only covers its superficial surface, bridging across the gyri. This leaves wider spaces between the pia and arachnoid and the cavities are known as the subarachnoid cisterns.

Although they are often described as distinct compartments, the subarachnoid cisterns are not truly anatomically distinct. Rather, these subarachnoid cisterns are separated from each other by a trabeculated porous wall with various-sized openings.

== Cisterns ==
There are many cisterns in the brain with several large ones noted with their own name. At the base of the spinal cord is another subarachnoid cistern: the lumbar cistern which is the site for a lumbar puncture. Some major subarachnoid cisterns:

- Cisterna magna also called cerebellomedullary cistern - the largest of the subarachnoid cisterns. It lies between the cerebellum and the medulla oblongata. It receives CSF from the fourth ventricle via the median aperture (foramen of Magendie). The cisterna magna contains:
1. The vertebral artery and the origin of the posterior inferior cerebellar artery (PICA)
2. The ninth (IX), tenth (X), eleventh (XI) and twelfth (XII) cranial nerves
- Pontine cistern. Surrounds the ventral aspect of the pons. It receives CSF via the paired lateral apertures. It contains:
1. The basilar artery and the origin of the anterior inferior cerebellar artery (AICA)
2. The origin of the superior cerebellar arteries
3. The sixth (VI) cranial nerve
- Interpeduncular cistern. It is situated at the base of the brain, between the two cerebral peduncles of midbrain and dorsum sellae and continuous below with the pontine cistern and superiorly with the chiasmatic cistern. It contains:
1. The optic chiasm
2. The bifurcation of the basilar artery
3. Peduncular segments of the posterior cerebral arteries (PCA)
4. Peduncular segments of the superior cerebellar arteries
5. Perforating branches of the PCA
6. The posterior communicating arteries (PCoA)
7. The basal vein
8. The third (III) cranial nerve, which passes between the posterior cerebral and superior cerebellar arteries
- Cerebellopontine angle cistern. It is situated at the cerebellopontine angle – the lateral angle between the cerebellum and the pons. It contains:
1. The seventh (VII) and eighth (VIII) cranial nerves
2. The anteroinferior cerebellar artery (AICA)
3. The fifth (V) cranial nerve and the petrosal vein
- Quadrigeminal cistern - It is situated dorsal to the midbrain. Thin, sheet-like extensions of the superior cistern that extend laterally about the midbrain, connecting it to the interpeduncular cistern. Ambient cistern may also refer to the combination of these extensions and the superior cistern. It is composed of a supratentorial and an infratentorial compartment. It contains:
1. The great cerebral vein
2. The posterior pericallosal arteries
3. The third portion of the superior cerebellar arteries
4. Perforating branches of the posterior cerebral and superior cerebellar arteries
5. The third portion of the posterior cerebral arteries

Its supratentorial portion contains:

1. The basal vein
2. The posterior cerebral artery

Its infratentorial portion contains:

1. The superior cerebellar artery
2. The fourth (IV) nerve
- Crural cistern. It is situated around the ventrolateral aspect of the midbrain. It contains:
1. The anterior choroidal artery
2. The medial posterior choroidal artery
3. The basal vein
- Carotid cistern. It is situated between the carotid artery and the ipsilateral optic nerve. It contains:
1. The internal carotid artery
2. The origin of the anterior choroidal artery
3. The origin of the posterior communicating artery
- Cistern of lateral cerebral fossa. It is situated in the fissure between the frontal and temporal lobes. It contains:
1. The middle cerebral artery
2. The middle cerebral veins
3. The fronto-orbital veins
4. Collaterals to the basal vein
- Cistern of lamina terminalis. It is situated just rostral to the third ventricle. It contains:
1. The anterior cerebral arteries (A1 and proximal A2)
2. The anterior communicating artery
3. Heubner's artery
4. The hypothalamic arteries
5. The origin of the fronto-orbital arteries
- Lumbar cistern. It extends from the conus medullaris (L1-L2) to about the level of the second sacral vertebra. It contains the filum terminale and the nerve roots of the cauda equina. It is from the lumbar cistern that CSF is withdrawn during a lumbar puncture.

== Clinical significance ==
It is clinically significant that cerebral arteries, veins, and cranial nerves traverse through the subarachnoid space, maintaining their meningeal covering until they exit the skull.

== See also ==
- Subarachnoid hemorrhage
- Terminal cisterna
