= Christian Friedrich =

Christian Friedrich may refer to:

- Christian Friedrich (baseball) (born 1987), American baseball player
- Christian Friedrich (bobsleigh) (born 1981), German bobsledder
- Christian Friedrich, Baron Stockmar (1787–1863), Anglo-Belgian statesman

== See also ==
- Friedrich Christian (disambiguation)
