= Plexal point =

Arterial entry point of the brain

Within anatomy for the circulatory system, the plexal point or ventral choroidal point is the proposed naming for the point at which the anterior choroidal artery enters into the lateral ventricle of the brain at the tela choroidea. The choroid fissure, in this sense, is the narrow cleft along the medial wall of the lateral ventricle, where the choroid plexus is attached at the margins. Not to be confused with the choroidal fissure of the eye.

On lateral angiograms, the plexal point is seen to be 18–26 mm from the origin of the anterior choroidal artery. It is an important angiographic landmark, characterized by a steep downward progression of a few millimeters, then a sharp posterior turn to mark the point of entry.
