= Thalamogeniculate artery =

Details
- Source: Posterior cerebral artery
- Supplies: Thalamus

Identifiers
- Latin: a. thalamogeniculata
- TA98: A12.2.07.090
- FMA: 50629

The thalamogeniculate artery is either a single artery or group of smaller arteries arising from the posterior cerebral artery (distal to the origin of the posterior communicating artery). It is part of the posterolateral central arteries. It supplies parts of the thalamus (including the geniculate nuclei). It shares a similar course with the thalamogeniculate vein.

== Anatomy ==
=== Distribution ===
According to the 42th Edition of Gray's Anatomy, the thalamogeniculate arteries supply the posterior thalamus, and medial geniculate nucleus.

According to the Medical Dictionary of the French Academy of Medicine, it supplies the ventral lateral nucleus of thalamus, and the geniculate nuclei.

== Clinical significance ==
A loss of supply of this artery presents clinically with sensory disturbances, and restlessness.
