= Cistern of lateral cerebral fossa =

Subarachnoid cistern formed in front of each temporal lobe

Details

Identifiers
- Latin: cisterna fossae lateralis cerebri
- TA98: A14.1.01.210
- TA2: 5394
- FMA: 83723

The cistern of lateral cerebral fossa (also cistern of the lateral sulcus, or Sylvian cistern) is an elongated subarachnoid cistern formed by arachnoid mater bridging the lateral sulcus between the frontal, temporal, and parietal opercula. The cistern contains the middle cerebral artery (MCA) and its branches, and the two (i.e. superficial and deep) middle cerebral veins (MCVs).

The cistern is subdivided into three compartments: the superficial opercular compartment (SOC) (most superficial), deep opercular compartment (DOC) (intermediate), and cisternal compartment (CC) (deepest). The SOC contains the superficial MCV, and distal branches of the MCA; the DOC contains the M3 segment of the MCA; the CC contains the M1 and M2 segments of MCA, and the deep MCV.
