= Olfactory trigone =

Part of the brain involved in smell

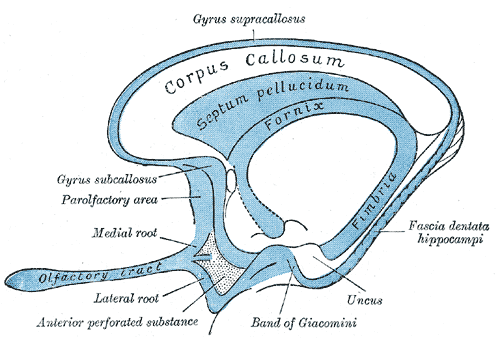
- Scheme of rhinencephalon. (Olfactory trigone not labeled, but region is visible at bottom left, between anterior perforated substance and olfactory tract.)

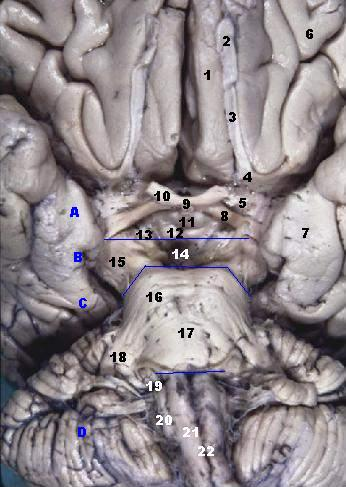
- Human brainstem anterior view. (Olfactory trigone is #4, at upper right)

Details

Identifiers
- Latin: trigonum olfactorium
- NeuroNames: 34
- NeuroLex ID: birnlex_4042
- TA98: A14.1.09.432
- TA2: 5542
- FMA: 74883

The olfactory trigone is a small triangular area in front of the anterior perforated substance.

Its apex, directed forward, occupies the posterior part of the olfactory sulcus, and is brought into view by throwing back the olfactory tract.

It is part of the olfactory pathway.
