= Quadrigeminal cistern =

Space in the skull

Details

Identifiers
- Latin: cisterna quadrigeminalis, cisterna venae magnae cerebri
- TA98: A14.1.01.217
- TA2: 5399
- FMA: 74511

The quadrigeminal cistern (also cistern of great cerebral vein, vein of Galen cistern, superior cistern, Bichat's canal, or peripineal cistern) is a subarachnoid cistern situated between splenium of corpus callosum, and the superior surface of the cerebellum. It contains a part of the great cerebral vein, the posterior cerebral artery, quadrigeminal artery, glossopharyngeal nerve (CN IX), and the pineal gland.

== Structure ==
The quadrigeminal cistern lies between the splenium of the corpus callosum (superiorly), the cerebellar vermis (inferiorly and posteriorly), and the tentorial margin. It is just superior to the tectum of the mesencephalon (midbrain). It lies medial to part of the medial occipital cortex. It is posterior to the brainstem and third ventricle; it extends between the layers of the tela choroidea of the third ventricle.

The cistern may extend anterior-ward between the thalamus and corpus callosum to form the cistern of velum interpositum.

=== Contents ===
The superior cistern contains a number of important structures, including:

- great cerebral vein - lies superiorly, helps to form its superior wall.
- (caudal, distal portions of) internal cerebral veins (as they converge to form the great cerebral vein)
- (parts of the) posterior cerebral arteries (their (sources differ) P3 segments/P4 segments)
- (parts of the) medial posterior choroidal arteries and lateral posterior choroidal artery
- (parts of the) quadrigeminal artery
- (the exit of the) trochlear nerve (CN IV)
- (the exit of the) glossopharyngeal nerve (CN IX)
- pineal gland

== Clinical significance ==
Arteriovenous malformations of the great cerebral vein can create an enlarged pouch of vein in the superior cistern. This is derived from the prosencephalic vein present during prenatal development. This can be diagnosed soon after birth. Medical ultrasound may be used, where it displaces the third ventricle. Angiography may also be used.

The superior cistern may be opened during neurosurgery. This is used in order to access deeper brain structures, such as the superior colliculus.

== History ==
The superior cistern may also be known as the cistern of great cerebral vein, the quadrigeminal cistern, and Bichat's canal.
