= Anterior perforated substance =

Part of the brain

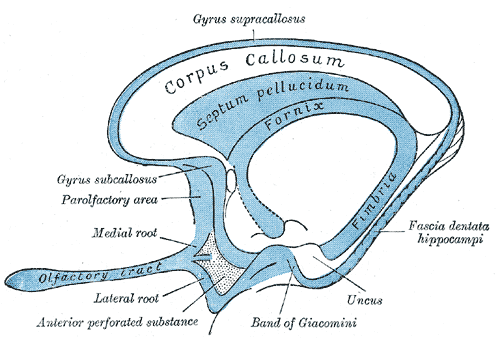
- Scheme of rhinencephalon (anterior perforated substance labeled at bottom left)

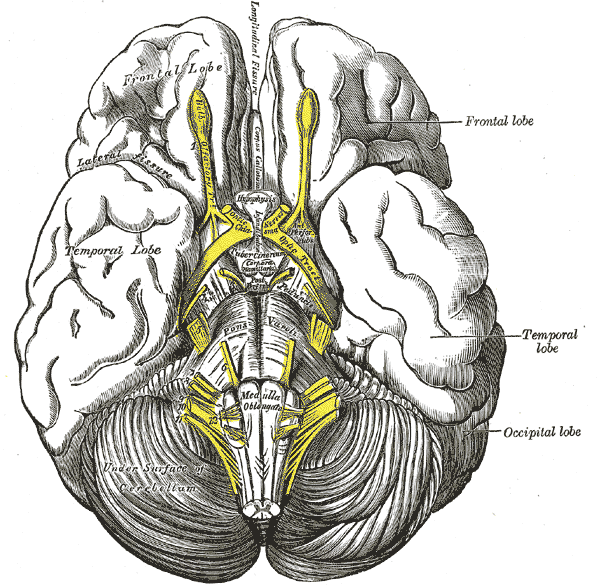
- Base of brain (anterior perforated substance labeled at center.)

Details

Identifiers
- Latin: substantia perforata anterior
- NeuroNames: 282
- NeuroLex ID: birnlex_1096
- TA98: A14.1.09.437
- TA2: 5544
- FMA: 61891

The anterior perforated substance is a part of the brain. It is bilateral. It is irregular and quadrilateral. It lies in front of the optic tract and behind the olfactory trigone.

== Structure ==
The anterior perforated substance is bilateral. It lies in front of the optic tract. It lies behind the olfactory trigone, separated by the fissure prima. Medially and in front, it is continuous with the subcallosal gyrus. Laterally, it is bounded by the lateral stria of the olfactory tract, and is continued into the uncus.

Its gray substance is confluent above with that of the corpus striatum, and is perforated anteriorly by numerous small blood vessels that supply such areas as the internal capsule.

The anterior cerebral artery arises just below the anterior perforated substance. The middle cerebral artery passes through its lateral two thirds.

=== Blood supply ===
The anterior perforated substance is supplied by lenticulostriate arteries, which branch from the middle cerebral artery. It is also supplied by anterior choroidal artery. Small branches from these create holes, which give the anterior perforated substance its name.

== History ==
The anterior perforated substance is named after the holes created by small blood vessels that supply it.

== Additional images ==
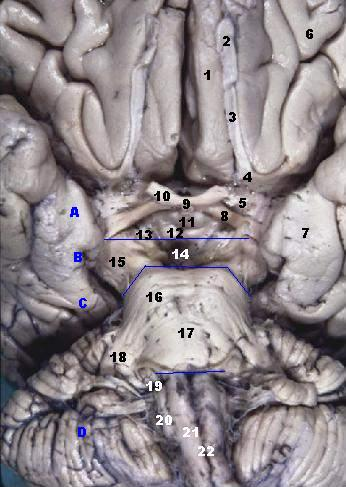
Human brainstem anterior view

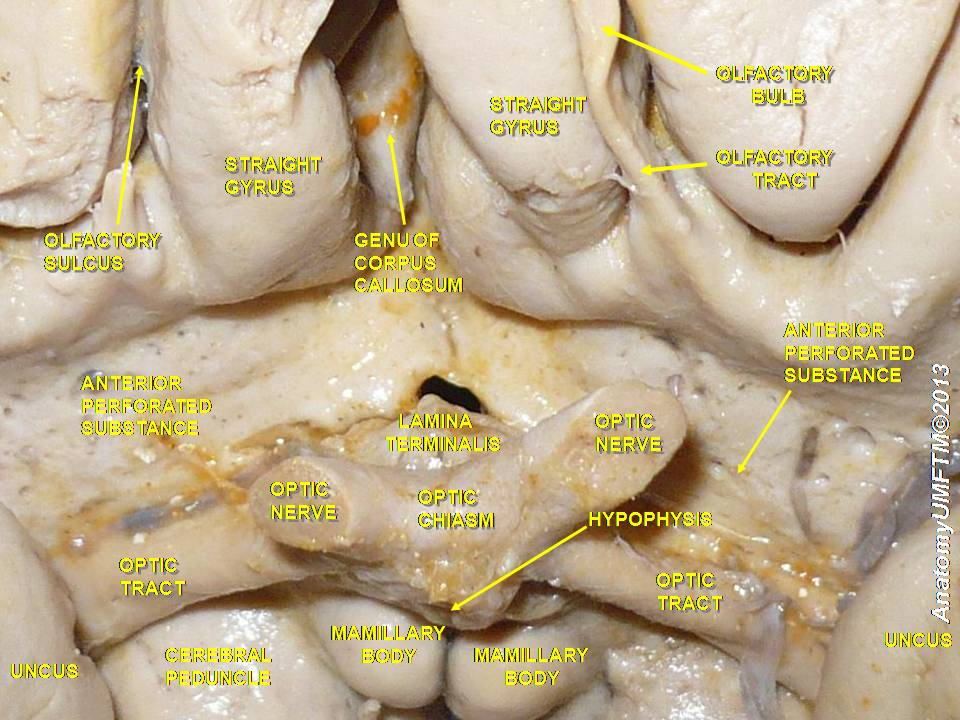
Cerebrum. Inferior view. Deep dissection

== See also ==
- Posterior perforated substance
