= Posterior perforated substance =

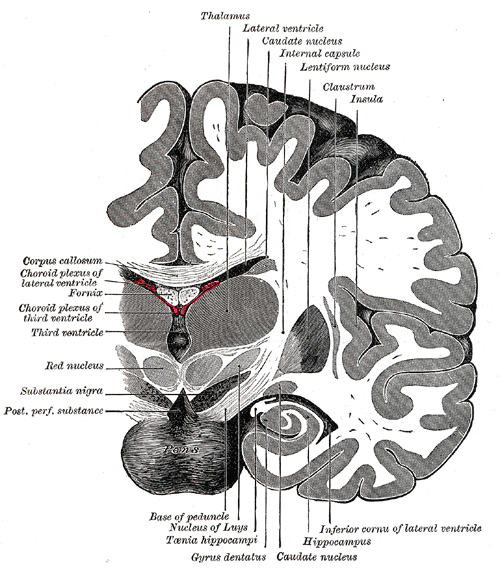
- Coronal section of brain immediately in front of pons. (Post. perf. substance labeled at lower left.)

Details

Identifiers
- Latin: substantia perforata posterior, substantia perforata interpeduncularis
- NeuroNames: 1580

The posterior perforated substance (PPS), also known as locus perforatus posticus, is a layer of gray matter which is pierced by small apertures for the transmission of blood vessels. Its inferior part lies on the ventral aspect of the medial portions of the tegmenta and contains the interpeduncular nucleus; its superior part forms part of the floor of the third ventricle.

The PPS is situated between the two cerebral peduncles in the midbrain. and posterior to the two mammillary bodies. It is perforated by the posteromedial central arteries – branches of the posterior cerebral arteries en route to the thalamus and basal ganglia.

== See also ==
- Anterior perforated substance

== Additional images ==
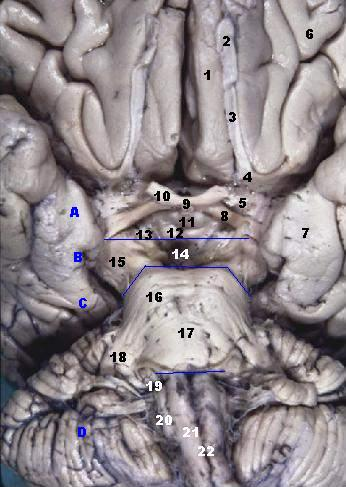
Human brainstem anterior view
