= End artery =

An end artery or terminal artery is an artery that is the only supply of oxygenated blood to a portion of tissue. Arteries which do not anastomose with their neighbors are called end arteries. There is no collateral circulation present besides the end arteries.

Examples of an end artery include the splenic artery that supplies the spleen and the renal artery that supplies the kidneys. End arteries are of particular interest to medicine where they supply the heart or brain because if the arteries are occluded, the tissue is completely cut off, leading to a myocardial infarction or an ischaemic stroke. Other end arteries supply all or parts of the liver, intestines, fingers, toes, ears, nose, retina, penis, and other organs.

Because vital tissues such as the brain or heart muscle are vulnerable to ischaemia, arteries often form anastomoses to provide alternative supplies of fresh blood. End arteries can exist when no anastomosis exists or when an anastomosis exists but is incapable of providing a sufficient supply of blood, thus the two types of end arteries are:

- Anatomic (true) end artery: No anastomoses.
- Functional end artery: Ineffectual anastomoses.

An example of a true terminal artery is that which supplies the retina. Functional end arteries supply segments of the brain, liver, kidneys, spleen and intestines; they may also exist in the heart.

Occlusion of an end artery causes serious nutritional disturbances resulting in death of the tissue supplied by it. For example, occlusion of central artery of retina results in blindness. The results are severe because the blood flow to that region is completely stopped since there is no collateral circulation.
