= Internal capsule =

White matter structure of the brain

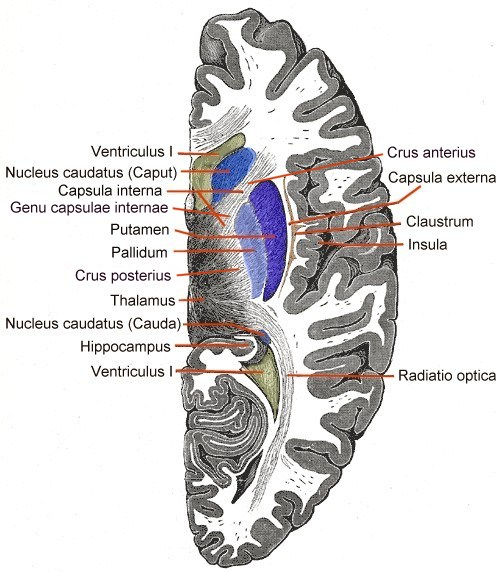
- Horizontal section of right cerebral hemisphere. (Capsula interna labeled at upper left.)

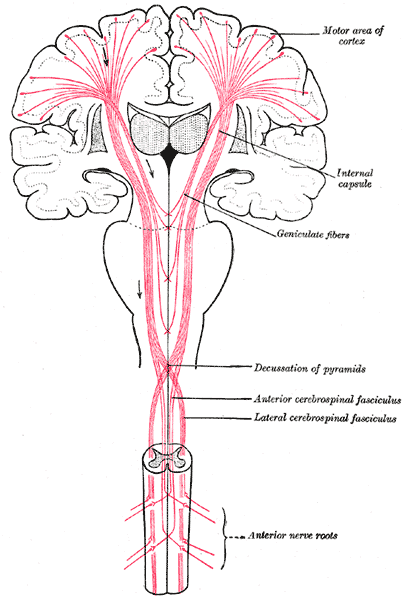
- The motor tract.

Details

Identifiers
- Latin: capsula interna
- MeSH: D020772
- NeuroNames: 198
- NeuroLex ID: birnlex_1659
- TA98: A14.1.09.524
- TA2: 5576
- FMA: 61950

The internal capsule is a paired white matter structure, as a two-way tract, carrying ascending and descending fibers, to and from the cerebral cortex. The internal capsule is situated in the inferomedial part of each cerebral hemisphere of the brain. It carries information past the subcortical basal ganglia. As it courses it separates the caudate nucleus and the thalamus from the putamen and the globus pallidus. It also separates the caudate nucleus and the putamen in the dorsal striatum, a brain region involved in motor and reward pathways.

The internal capsule is V-shaped in transection forming an anterior and posterior limb, with the angle between them called the genu.

The corticospinal tract constitutes a large part of the internal capsule, carrying motor information from the primary motor cortex to the lower motor neurons in the spinal cord. Above the basal ganglia the corticospinal tract is a part of the corona radiata. Below the basal ganglia the tract is called cerebral crus (a part of the cerebral peduncle) and below the pons it is referred to as the corticospinal tract.

== Structure ==
The internal capsule is V-shaped when cut horizontally in a transverse plane, and consists of three parts: the genu, anterior limb, and posterior limb.

=== Genu ===
The genu is the bend, or flexure in the V of the internal capsule. It is formed by fibers from the corticobulbar tract. The fibers in this region are named the geniculate fibers that carry upper motor neurons from the motor cortex to cranial nerve nuclei that mainly govern muscle motion of the head and face. The geniculate fibers originate in the motor cortex, and after passing downward through the base of the cerebral peduncle with the cerebrospinal fibers, undergo decussation and end in the motor nuclei of the cranial nerves of the opposite side.

=== Anterior limb ===
The anterior limb of the internal capsule (or crus anterius) is situated in front of the genu, between the head of the caudate nucleus and the lentiform nucleus. It contains:

1. Thalamocortical fibers passing from the lateral thalamic nuclei to the frontal lobe
2. Corticothalamic fibres passing from the frontal lobe to the lateral thalamic nuclei
3. Transversely oriented fibers connecting the caudate nucleus to the putamen
4. Corticostriatal fibers connecting the cortex with the striatum
5. Frontopontine fibers passing from the frontal lobe through the medial fifth of the base of the cerebral peduncle to the pontine nuclei
6. Thalamic pontine fibers

=== Posterior limb ===
The posterior limb of internal capsule (or occipital part) is the portion of the internal capsule posterior to the genu. It is situated between the thalamus and the lentiform nucleus.

The anterior half of the posterior limb contains fibers of the corticospinal tract, and corticobulbar tract (in an anteroposterior somatotopic arrangement), as well as corticorubral fibres (passing from the frontal lobe to the red nucleus) that accompany the corticospinal tract.

The posterior third of the posterior limb contains:

1. Third-order sensory neurons passing from the posterolateral nucleus of thalamus to the postcentral gyrus (in an anteroposterior somatotopic arrangement)
2. Fibers of the optic radiation, from the lower visual centers to the cortex of the occipital lobe;
3. Acoustic fibers, from the lateral lemniscus to the temporal lobe
4. Fibers that pass from the occipital and temporal lobes to the pontine nuclei

The retrolenticular part contains fibers from the optic system, coming from the lateral geniculate nucleus of the thalamus. More posteriorly, this becomes the optic radiation. Some fibers from the medial geniculate nucleus (which carry auditory information) also pass in the retrolenticular internal capsule, but most are in the sublenticular part.

The sublenticular part is beneath the lentiform nucleus, and contains fibers connecting with the temporal lobe. These include the auditory radiations and temporopontine fibers.

=== Blood supply ===
The superior parts of both the anterior and posterior limbs, and the genu of the internal capsule are supplied by the lenticulostriate arteries, which are branches of the M1 segment of the middle cerebral artery.

The inferior half of the anterior limb is supplied via the recurrent artery of Heubner, which is a branch of the anterior cerebral artery.

The inferior half of the posterior limb is supplied by the anterior choroidal artery, which is a branch of the internal carotid artery.

As in many parts of the body, some degree of variation in the blood supply exists. For example, thalamoperforator arteries, which are branches of the basilar artery, occasionally supply the inferior half of the posterior limb.

== Function ==
The internal capsule provides passage to ascending and descending fibres running to and from the cerebral cortex. Fibers include frontopontine fibers from the frontal lobe to the pontine nuclei; thalamocortical radiations; corticobulbar fibers from the cortex to the medulla oblongata, and corticospinal fibers.

== Clinical significance ==
The lenticulostriate arteries supply a large part of the internal capsule. These small vessels are particularly vulnerable to narrowing in the setting of chronic hypertension and can result in small, punctate infarctions or intraparenchymal haemorrhage due to vessel rupture.

=== Focal lesions ===
Due to the orderly somatotopic arrangement of elements of the posterior limb of the internal capsule, small lesions can produce selective functional deficits.

Lesions of the genu of the internal capsule affect fibers of the corticobulbar tract.

The primary motor cortex sends its axons through the posterior limb of the internal capsule. Lesions, therefore, result in a contralateral hemiparesis or hemiplegia. While symptoms of weakness due to an isolated lesion of the posterior limb can initially be severe, recovery of motor function is sometimes possible due to spinal projections of premotor cortical regions that are contained more rostrally in the internal capsule.

== See also ==
- External capsule
- Extreme capsule
