= Chiasmatic cistern =

Details

Identifiers
- Latin: cisterna chiasmatica, cisterna chiasmatis
- NeuroLex ID: birnlex_4003
- TA98: A14.1.01.211
- TA2: 5396
- FMA: 74515

The chiasmatic cistern or suprasellar cistern is a small subarachnoid cistern related to the optic chiasm.

== Anatomy ==
The cistern is situated superior to the optic chiasm, and inferior to the rostrum of corpus callosum.

The cistern is an extension of/communicates inferiorly with the interpeduncular cistern. The cistern of lamina terminalis connects the chiasmatic cistern with the pericallosal cistern.

=== Contents ===
It contains the anterior aspect of the optic chiasm and both optic nerves (CN II), the pituitary stalk, the origin of the anterior cerebral artery, and the anterior communicating artery.
