= Recurrent artery of Heubner =

Branch of the anterior cerebral artery in brain

Details
- Source: Anterior cerebral artery

The recurrent artery of Heubner, Heubner's artery or distal medial striate artery is a branch of the anterior cerebral artery. It supplies the head of the caudate nucleus and adjacent part of the anterior limb of internal capsule, olfactory regions, and parts of the putamen and septal nuclei.

It is named after the German paediatrician Otto Heubner.

== Structure ==
The recurrent artery of Heubner is a branch of the anterior cerebral artery. It has a mean diameter of 0.8 mm, and a mean length of 2.4 cm. It is also known together with the lenticulostriate arteries as a striate artery. The lenticulostriate arteries arise from the middle cerebral artery.

=== Variation ===
The recurrent artery of Heubner usually arises from the A1-A2 junction (between 44% and 62% of the time), but may arise from the proximal A2 segment (between 23% and 43%), or more rarely from the A1 segment (maybe up to 14% of the time).

The recurrent artery of Heubner has a very variable diameter and length. It varies in width from 0.2 mm to 1.3 mm. It varies in length between 0.9 cm and 3.8 cm.

== Function ==
The recurrent artery of Heubner supplies the anteromedial section of the caudate nucleus and the anterioinferior section of the internal capsule, as well as parts of the putamen and septal nuclei.

== Clinical significance ==
Infarction of the artery may cause brachiofacial hemiparesis due to ischemia of the anterior limb of internal capsule. More proximal portions of the artery may cause spastic paraparesis and sensory loss contralateral to the lesioned side. Urinary incontinence and gait apraxia may also occur. Occlusive damage to Heubner's artery may also present with contralateral grip reflex issues, and symptoms of frontal lobe disorder. Contralateral gaze preference with or without transcortical motor aphasia may present in instances where the left hemisphere is affected in this type of occlusion.

== History ==
The recurrent artery of Heubner is named after the German paediatrician Otto Heubner.
