= Interpeduncular cistern =

Subarachnoid cistern above and in front of the pons

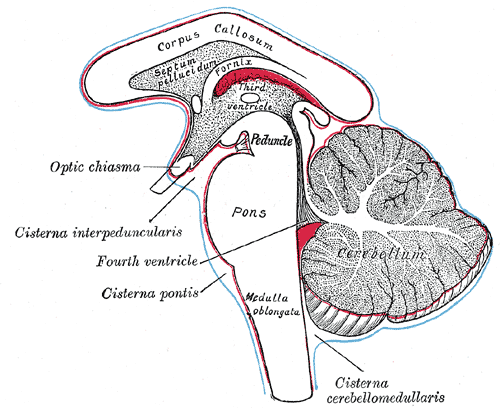
- Diagram showing the positions of the three principal subarachnoid cisterns. (Interpeduncular cistern labeled at left center.)

Details

Identifiers
- Latin: cisterna interpeduncularis
- TA98: A14.1.01.212
- TA2: 5397
- FMA: 83718

The interpeduncular cistern (or basal cistern) is the subarachnoid cistern situated between the dorsum sellae (anteriorly) and the two cerebral peduncles at the front of the midbrain. Its roof is represented by the floor of the third ventricle (i.e. posterior perforated substance, and the two mammillary bodies). Its floor is formed by the arachnoid membrane extending between the temporal lobes of either side. Anteriorly, it extends to the optic chiasm.

The cistern communicates superiorly with the chiasmatic cistern, and inferiorly with the pontine cistern. The chiasmatic cistern, cistern of lamina terminalis, and supracallosal cistern are all extensions of the interpeduncular cistern.

== Anatomy ==
=== Contents ===
The cistern contains:

- the posterior portion of the circle of Willis:
  - basilar artery (including its bifurcation),
  - (origins of the) posterior cerebral arteries,
  - posterior communicating arteries,
- (the origin of the) posterior thalamo-perforating arteries,
- (part of the) superior cerebellar artery,
- basal vein,
- (proximal portion of the) anterior ponto-mesencephalic vein,
- (proximal portion of the) oculomotor nerves (CN III),
- trochlear nerves (CN IV).
