= Anterior hypothalamic nucleus =

Neuron cluster of the hypothalamus

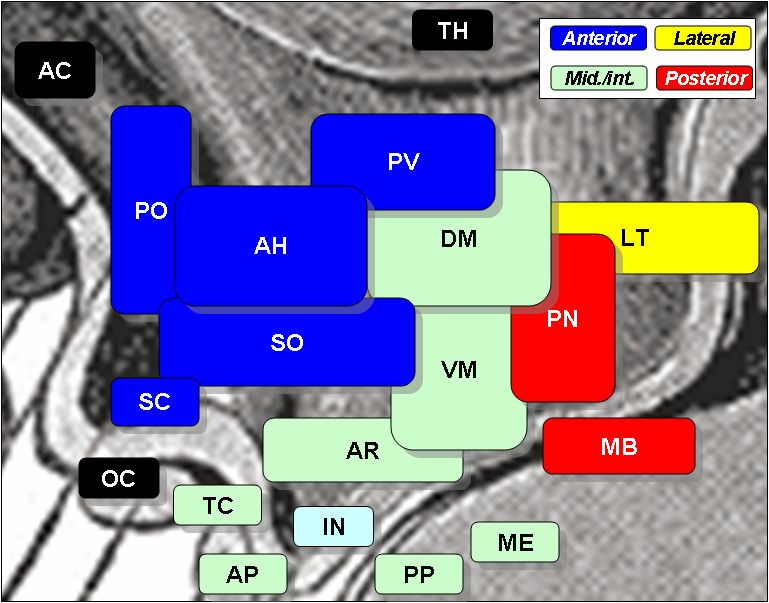
- Anterior hypothalamic nucleus is 'AH', at center left, in blue.

Details

Identifiers
- Latin: nucleus anterior hypothalami
- MeSH: D007025
- NeuroNames: 386
- NeuroLex ID: birnlex_1226
- TA98: A14.1.08.903
- TA2: 5719
- FMA: 62319

The anterior hypothalamic nucleus is a nucleus of the hypothalamus.

Its function is thermoregulation (cooling) of the body. Damage or destruction of this nucleus causes hyperthermia.

The anterior hypothalamus plays a role in regulating sleep.

The anterior hypothalamic region is sometimes grouped with the preoptic area.
