= Tegmentum =

Part of the brain stem

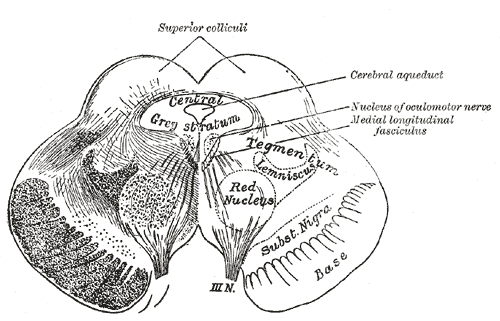
- Transverse section of mid-brain at level of superior colliculi, with anterior side pointing downward. ("Tegmentum" visible center right.)

- Section through superior colliculus showing path of oculomotor nerve. (Tegmentum not labeled, but surrounding structures more clearly defined.)

Details

Identifiers
- Latin: tegmentum
- NeuroLex ID: birnlex_1031

The tegmentum (from Latin for "covering") is a general area within the brainstem. The tegmentum is the ventral part of the midbrain and the tectum is the dorsal part of the midbrain. It is located between the ventricular system and distinctive basal or ventral structures at each level. It forms the floor of the midbrain (mesencephalon) whereas the tectum forms the ceiling. It is a multisynaptic network of neurons that is involved in many subconscious homeostatic and reflexive pathways. It is a motor center that relays inhibitory signals to the thalamus and basal nuclei preventing unwanted body movement.

The tegmentum area includes various different structures, such as the rostral end of the reticular formation, several nuclei controlling eye movements, the periaqueductal gray matter, the red nucleus, the substantia nigra, and the ventral tegmental area.

The tegmentum is the location of several cranial nerve nuclei. The nuclei of CN III and IV are located in the tegmentum portion of the midbrain. The nuclei of CN V to VIII are located in the tegmentum at the level of the pons. The nuclei of CN IX, X, and XII are located in that of the medulla.

== Development ==
In embryos, the tegmentum is the anterior half of the neural tube. However, for fetuses to adults, tegmentum refers only to the parts of the brain that remain relatively unchanged after development is complete, i.e. at the brain stem especially the midbrain. Other parts, on the other hand, develop further, through folding and thickening, and have different names. Still, it is considered a continuous central region through all levels of the brainstem.

Structures that develop to grow ventral or lateral outside this primitive tube as add-ons (e.g., the crus cerebri in the anterior of the midbrain) are not considered part of the tegmentum, as they are not part of the primitive neural tube but grow as projections from the cerebral cortex. However, parts that were inside the primitive neural tube and remained an integral part of it after complete development (e.g., the red nucleus) are considered part of the tegmentum.

== Divisions ==
The tegmentum forms distinguished divisions in the midbrain, pons, and medulla.

=== Midbrain tegmentum ===
The midbrain tegmentum is the part of the midbrain extending from the substantia nigra to the cerebral aqueduct in a horizontal section of the midbrain. Structures included in the midbrain tegmentum include the red nucleus, reticular formation, and substantia nigra. The red nucleus is responsible for controlling basic body and limb movements. The reticular formation controls arousal and self-consciousness, and the substantia nigra integrates voluntary movements.

=== Lateral tegmental field ===
The lateral tegmental field (LTF) or lateral tegmentum (more specifically the dorsal motor nucleus of the vagus nerve and the solitary nucleus) is the source of several neural pathways in the brain's noradrenaline system.

=== Other ===
Other pertinent areas of the tegmentum are:

- Ventral tegmental area (VTA)
- Periaqueductal gray matter
- Reticular formation
- Red nucleus
- Substantia nigra

== See also ==
- Midbrain#Tectum
- Pretectal area (Pretectum)
