= Basal vein =

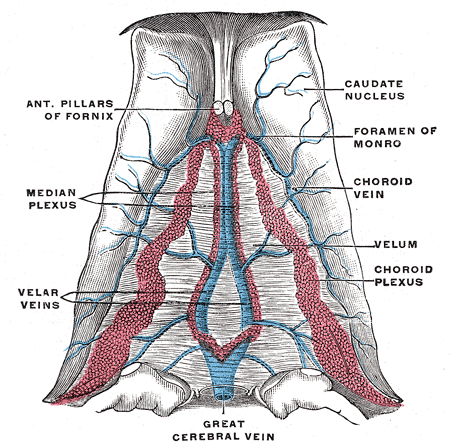
- Choroid plexus (basal veins not labeled, but visible draining into great cerebral vein)

Details
- Drains to: Great cerebral vein

Identifiers
- Latin: vena basalis
- TA98: A12.3.06.018
- TA2: 4916
- FMA: 50990

The basal vein is a vein in the brain. It is formed at the anterior perforated substance by the union of

- (a) a small anterior cerebral vein which accompanies the anterior cerebral artery and supplies the medial surface of the frontal lobe by the fronto-basal vein.
- (b) the deep middle cerebral vein (deep Sylvian vein), which receives tributaries from the insula and neighboring gyri, and runs in the lower part of the lateral cerebral fissure, and
- (c) the inferior striate veins, which leave the corpus striatum through the anterior perforated substance.

The basal vein passes backward around the cerebral peduncle, and ends in the great cerebral vein; it receives tributaries from the interpeduncular fossa, the inferior horn of the lateral ventricle, the hippocampal gyrus, and the mid-brain.
