= Cerebral crus =

Part of the cerebral peduncle stalks

- Obtuse section (perpendicular to the brainstem) through the superior colliculus showing label for cerebral crus at lower right.

Details

Identifiers
- Latin: crus cerebri
- MeSH: D065843
- NeuroNames: 539
- NeuroLex ID: birnlex_1218
- TA98: A14.1.06.005; A14.1.09.259
- TA2: 5880
- FMA: 72464

The cerebral crus (crus cerebri. crus means ‘leg’ in Latin.) is the anterior portion of the cerebral peduncle which contains the motor tracts, traveling from the cerebral cortex to the pons and spine. The plural of which is cerebral crura.

In some older texts, this is called the cerebral peduncle, but presently, it is usually limited to just the anterior white matter portion of it.

== Additional images ==
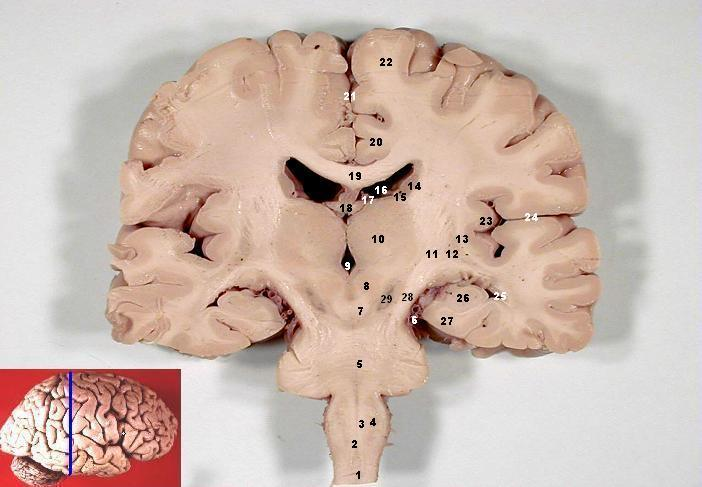
Human brain frontal (coronal) section, number 28 indicates the cerebral crus.

== See also ==
- Efferent nerve fiber
- Motor neuron (efferent neuron)
- Motor nerve
