= Cerebral peduncle =

Stalks between cerebrum and brainstem

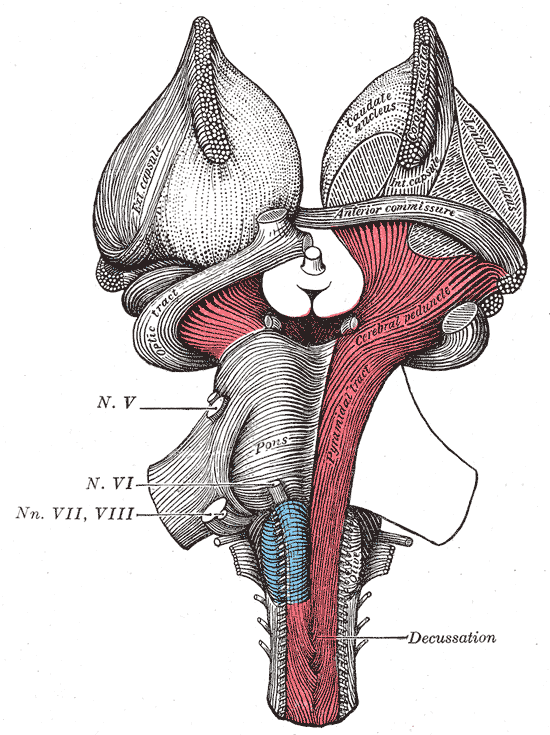
- Superficial dissection of brain-stem. Ventral view. ("cerebral peduncle" visible in red at center-right)

- Obtuse section (perpendicular to the brainstem) through superior colliculus showing path of oculomotor nerve (crus cerebri labeled at lower left).

Details

Identifiers
- Latin: pedunculus cerebri
- MeSH: D065850
- NeuroNames: 487
- NeuroLex ID: birnlex_1202
- TA98: A14.1.06.004
- TA2: 5878
- FMA: 62394

The cerebral peduncles (In Latin, ped- means 'foot'.) are the two stalks that attach the cerebrum to the brainstem. They are structures at the front of the midbrain which arise from the ventral pons and contain the large ascending (sensory) and descending (motor) tracts that run to and from the cerebrum from the pons. Mainly, the three common areas that give rise to the cerebral peduncles are the cerebral cortex, the spinal cord and the cerebellum. The region includes the tegmentum, crus cerebri and pretectum. By this definition, the cerebral peduncles are also known as the basis pedunculi, while the large ventral bundle of efferent fibers is referred to as the cerebral crus (crus means ‘leg’ in Latin.) or the pes pedunculi (pes means 'foot' in Latin.).

The cerebral peduncles are located on either side of the midbrain and are the frontmost part of the midbrain, and act as the connectors between the rest of the midbrain and the thalamic nuclei and thus the cerebrum. As a whole, the cerebral peduncles assist in refining motor movements, learning new motor skills, and converting proprioceptive information into balance and posture maintenance. Important fiber tracts that run through the cerebral peduncles are the corticospinal, corticopontine, and corticobulbar tracts. Damage to the cerebral peduncles results in unrefined motor skills, imbalance, and lack of proprioception.

== Structure ==
The descending upper fibers from the internal capsule continue on through the midbrain and are then seen as the fibers in the cerebral peduncles. The corticopontine fibers are found in the outer and inner third of the cerebral peduncle, these are the cortical input to the pontine nuclei. The corticobulbar and corticospinal fibers are found in the middle third of the cerebral peduncle. The corticospinal tract exits the internal capsule and is seen in the mid portion of the cerebral peduncles.

=== Cranial nerves ===
Cranial nerve III (oculomotor nerve) appears ventrally between the two cerebral peduncles in the interpeduncular fossa. Cranial nerve IV (trochlear nerve) wraps around the lowest part of the cerebral peduncle.

== Additional images ==
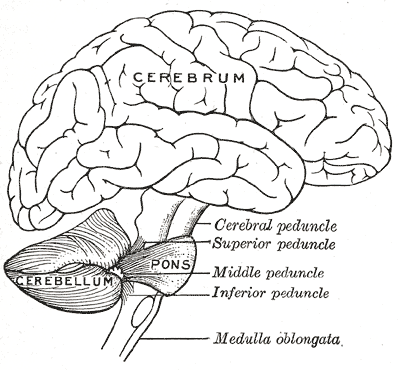
Scheme showing the connections of several parts of the brain

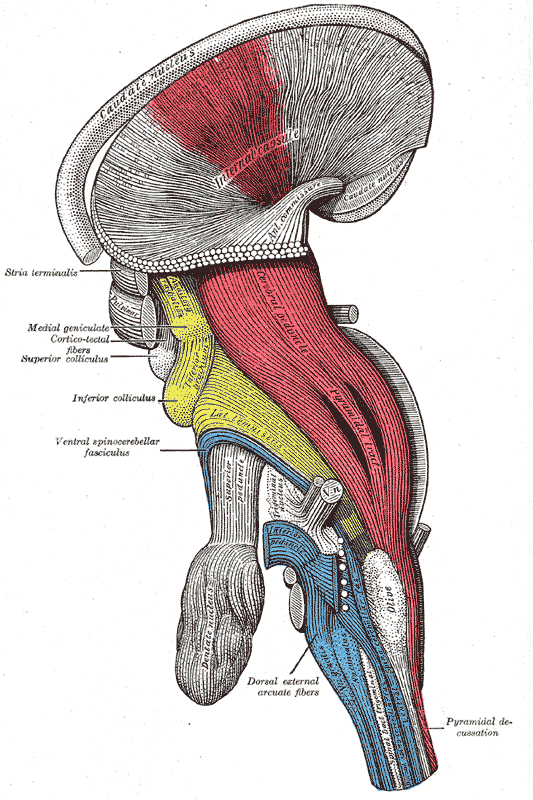
Deep dissection of brain-stem (lateral view)

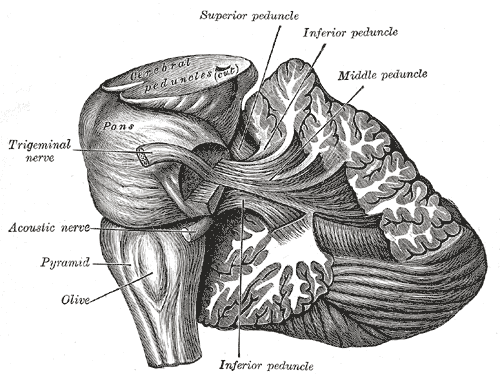
Dissection showing the projection fibers of the cerebellum

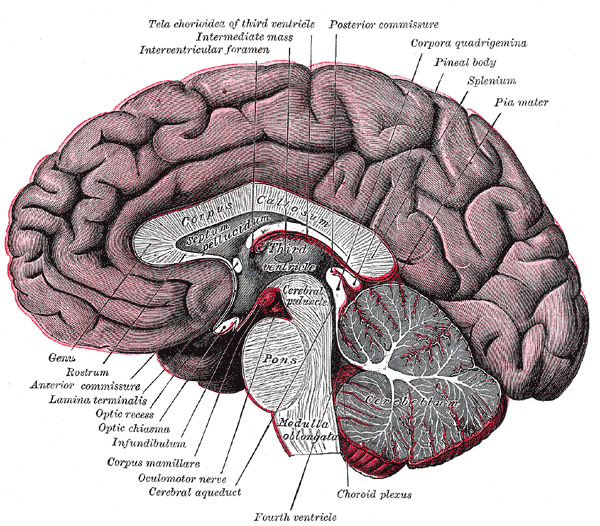
Median sagittal section of brain

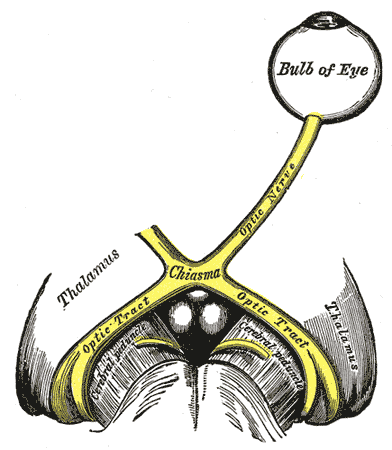
The left optic nerve and the optic tracts

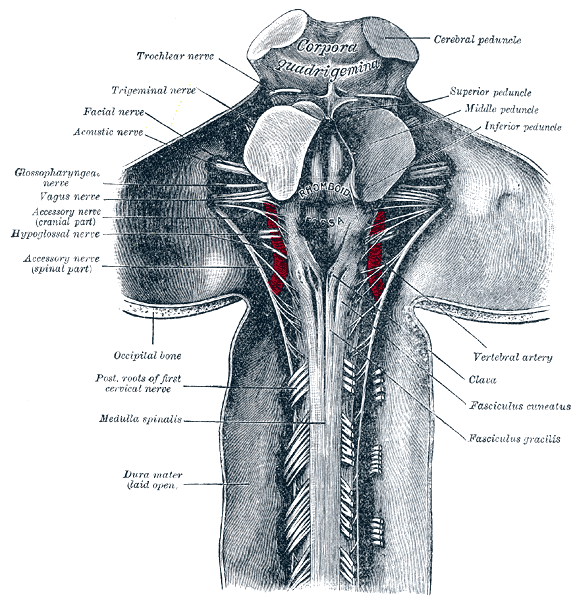
Upper part of medulla spinalis and hind- and mid-brains; posterior aspect, exposed in situ

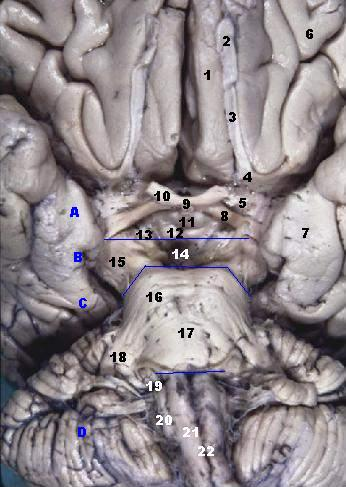
Human brainstem anterior view

== See also ==
- List of regions in the human brain
- Efferent nerve fiber
- Motor neuron (efferent neuron)
- Motor nerve
