= List of regions in the human brain =

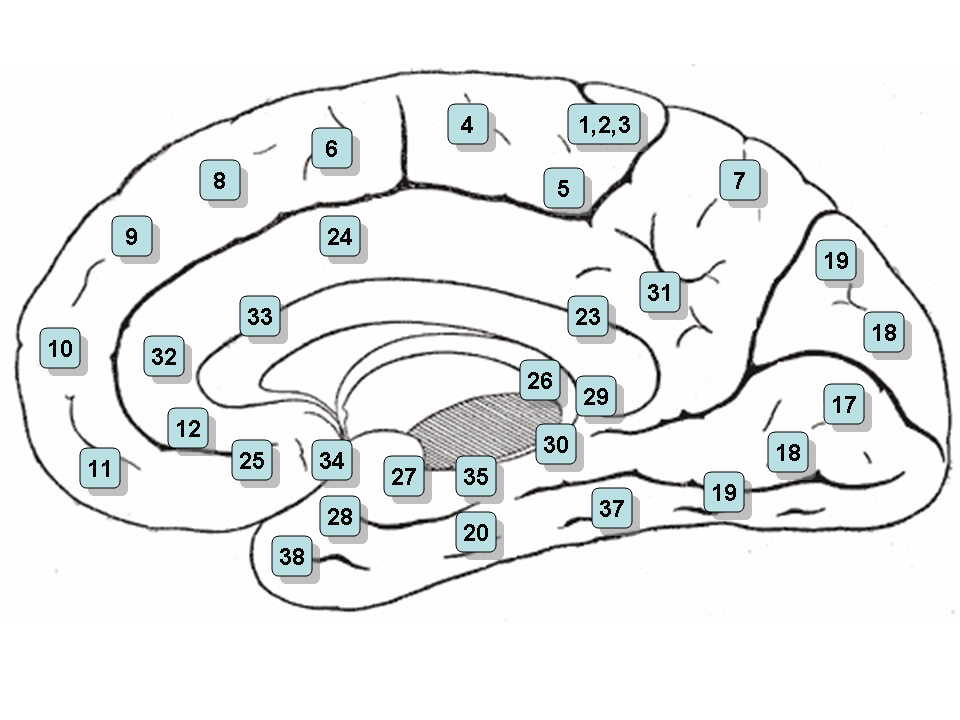
The Brodmann areas of a human brain

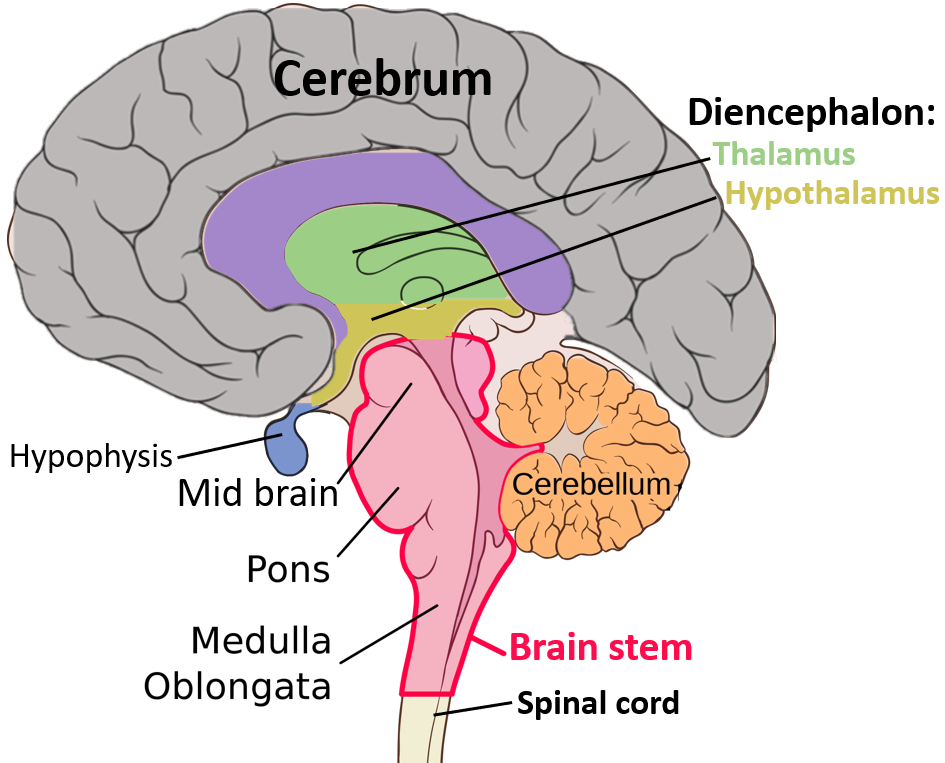
Most famous parts of the brain highlighted in different colours

The human brain anatomical regions are ordered following standard neuroanatomy hierarchies. Functional, connective, and developmental regions are listed in parentheses where appropriate.

== Hindbrain (rhombencephalon) ==
Embryonic vertebrate subdivisions of the developing human brain

The hindbrain or rhombencephalon is a developmental categorization of portions of the central nervous system in vertebrates. It includes the medulla, pons, and cerebellum.

=== Myelencephalon ===
- Medulla oblongata
  - Medullary pyramids
  - Arcuate nucleus
  - Olivary body
    - Inferior olivary nucleus
  - Rostral ventrolateral medulla
  - Caudal ventrolateral medulla
  - Solitary nucleus (Nucleus of the solitary tract)
  - Respiratory center-Respiratory groups
    - Dorsal respiratory group
    - Ventral respiratory group or Apneustic centre
      - Pre-Bötzinger complex
      - Bötzinger complex
      - Retrotrapezoid nucleus
      - Nucleus retrofacialis
      - Nucleus retroambiguus
      - Nucleus para-ambiguus
  - Paramedian reticular nucleus
  - Gigantocellular reticular nucleus
  - Parafacial zone
  - Cuneate nucleus
  - Gracile nucleus
  - Perihypoglossal nuclei
    - Intercalated nucleus
    - Prepositus nucleus
    - Sublingual nucleus
  - Area postrema
  - Medullary cranial nerve nuclei
    - Inferior salivatory nucleus
    - Nucleus ambiguus
    - Dorsal nucleus of vagus nerve
    - Hypoglossal nucleus
  - Chemoreceptor trigger zone

=== Metencephalon ===
==== Pons Varolii ====
- Pontine nuclei
- Pontine cranial nerve nuclei
  - Chief or pontine nucleus of the trigeminal nerve sensory nucleus (V)
  - Motor nucleus for the trigeminal nerve (V)
  - Abducens nucleus (VI)
  - Facial nerve nucleus (VII)
  - Vestibulocochlear nuclei (VIII; vestibular nuclei and cochlear nuclei)
  - Superior salivatory nucleus
- Pontine tegmentum
  - Pontine micturition center (Barrington's nucleus)
  - Locus coeruleus
  - Pedunculopontine nucleus
  - Laterodorsal tegmental nucleus
  - Tegmental pontine reticular nucleus
  - Nucleus incertus
- Parabrachial area
  - Medial parabrachial nucleus
  - Lateral parabrachial nucleus
  - Subparabrachial nucleus (Kölliker-Fuse nucleus)
    - Pontine respiratory group
- Superior olivary complex
  - Medial superior olive
  - Lateral superior olive
  - Medial nucleus of the trapezoid body
- Paramedian pontine reticular formation
- Parvocellular reticular nucleus
- Caudal pontine reticular nucleus
- Cerebellar peduncles
  - Superior cerebellar peduncle
  - Middle cerebellar peduncle
  - Inferior cerebellar peduncle

==== Fourth ventricle ====
- Circumventricular organs (also around the Third ventricle)

==== Cerebellum ====
- Cerebellar vermis
- Cerebellar hemispheres
  - Anterior lobe
  - Posterior lobe
  - Flocculonodular lobe
- Cerebellar nuclei
  - Fastigial nucleus
  - Interposed nucleus
    - Globose nucleus
    - Emboliform nucleus
  - Dentate nucleus

== Midbrain (mesencephalon) ==
Cross-section of the midbrain

- Tectum
  - Corpora quadrigemina
    - Inferior colliculi
    - Superior colliculi
- Pretectum
- Tegmentum
  - Periaqueductal gray
  - Rostral interstitial nucleus of medial longitudinal fasciculus
  - Midbrain reticular formation
  - Dorsal raphe nucleus
  - Red nucleus
  - Ventral tegmental area
    - Parabrachial pigmented nucleus
    - Paranigral nucleus
    - Rostromedial tegmental nucleus
  - Caudal linear nucleus
  - Rostral linear nucleus of the raphe
  - Interfascicular nucleus
  - Substantia nigra
    - Pars compacta
    - Pars reticulata
  - Interpeduncular nucleus
- Cerebral peduncle
  - Crus cerebri
- Mesencephalic cranial nerve nuclei
  - Oculomotor nucleus (III)
  - Edinger–Westphal nucleus
  - Trochlear nucleus (IV)
- Mesencephalic duct (cerebral aqueduct, aqueduct of Sylvius)

== Forebrain (prosencephalon) ==
=== Interbrain (Diencephalon) ===
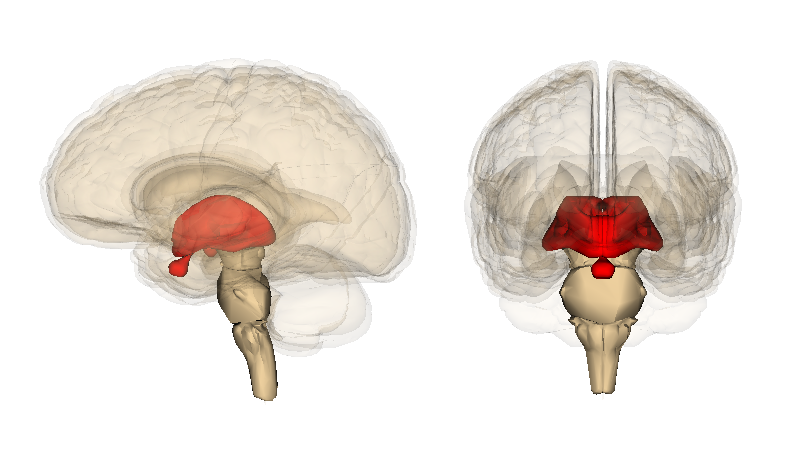
Diencephalon

==== Epithalamus ====
- Pineal body (pineal gland)
- Habenular nuclei
- Stria medullaris
- Taenia thalami

==== Third ventricle ====
- Subcommissural organ
- Circumventricular organs (also around the Fourth ventricle)

==== Thalamus ====
- Anterior nuclear group
  - Anteroventral nucleus (a.k.a. ventral anterior nucleus)
  - Anterodorsal nucleus
  - Anteromedial nucleus
- Medial nuclear group
  - Medial dorsal nucleus
  - Midline nuclear group
  - Paratenial nucleus
  - Reuniens nucleus (a.k.a. medioventral nucleus)
  - Rhomboidal nucleus
  - Intralaminar nuclear group
  - Centromedian nucleus
  - Parafascicular nucleus
  - Paracentral nucleus
  - Central lateral nucleus
- Lateral nuclear group
  - Lateral dorsal nucleus
  - Lateral posterior nucleus
  - Pulvinar
- Ventral nuclear group
  - Ventral anterior nucleus
  - Ventral lateral nucleus
  - Ventral posterior nucleus
    - Ventral posterior lateral nucleus
    - Ventral posterior medial nucleus
- Metathalamus
  - Medial geniculate body
  - Lateral geniculate body
- Thalamic reticular nucleus

==== Hypothalamus (limbic system, HPA axis) ====
- Anterior
  - Medial area
    - Parts of preoptic area
      - Medial preoptic nucleus
        - INAH 1
        - INAH 2
        - INAH 3
        - INAH 4
      - Median preoptic nucleus
    - Suprachiasmatic nucleus
    - Paraventricular nucleus
    - Supraoptic nucleus (mainly)
    - Anterior hypothalamic nucleus
  - Lateral area
    - Parts of preoptic area
      - Lateral preoptic nucleus
    - Anterior part of Lateral nucleus
    - Part of supraoptic nucleus
  - Other nuclei of preoptic area
    - Median preoptic nucleus
    - Periventricular preoptic nucleus
- Tuberal
  - Medial area
    - Dorsomedial hypothalamic nucleus
    - Ventromedial nucleus
    - Arcuate nucleus
  - Lateral area
    - Tuberal part of Lateral nucleus
    - Lateral tuberal nuclei
- Posterior
  - Medial area
    - Mammillary nuclei (part of mammillary bodies)
    - Posterior nucleus
  - Lateral area
    - Posterior part of Lateral nucleus
- Surface
  - Median eminence
  - Mammillary bodies
  - Pituitary stalk (infundibulum)
- Optic chiasm
- Subfornical organ
- Periventricular nucleus
- Tuber cinereum
  - Tuberal nucleus
  - Tuberomammillary nucleus
- Tuberal region
- Mammillary nucleus

==== Subthalamus (HPA axis) ====
- Subthalamic nucleus
- Zona incerta

==== Pituitary gland (HPA axis) ====
- Neurohypophysis
- Pars intermedia (Intermediate lobe)
- Adenohypophysis

=== Telencephalon (cerebrum) / Cerebral hemispheres ===
==== White matter ====
- Centrum semiovale
- Corona radiata
- Internal capsule
- External capsule
- Extreme capsule

==== Subcortical ====
- Hippocampus (Medial temporal lobe)
  - Dentate gyrus
  - Cornu ammonis (CA fields)
    - Cornu ammonis area 1 (CA1)
    - Cornu ammonis area 2 (CA2)
    - Cornu ammonis area 3 (CA3)
    - Cornu ammonis area 4 (CA4)
- Amygdala (limbic system, limbic lobe)
  - Central nucleus (autonomic nervous system)
  - Medial nucleus (accessory olfactory system)
  - Cortical and basomedial nuclei (main olfactory system)
  - Lateral and basolateral nuclei (frontotemporal cortical system)
- Extended amygdala
  - Stria terminalis
    - Bed nucleus of the stria terminalis
- Claustrum
- Basal ganglia
  - Striatum
    - Dorsal striatum (a.k.a. neostriatum)
      - Putamen
      - Caudate nucleus
    - Ventral striatum
      - Nucleus accumbens
      - Olfactory tubercle
  - Globus pallidus (forms nucleus lentiformis with putamen)
    - Ventral pallidum
  - Subthalamic nucleus
- Basal forebrain
  - Anterior perforated substance
  - Substantia innominata
  - Nucleus basalis
  - Diagonal band of Broca
  - Septal nuclei
    - Medial septal nuclei
  - Lamina terminalis
    - Vascular organ of lamina terminalis

==== Rhinencephalon (paleocortex) ====
- Olfactory bulb
- Olfactory tract
- Anterior olfactory nucleus
- Piriform cortex
- Anterior commissure
- Uncus
- Periamygdaloid cortex

==== Cerebral cortex (neocortex) ====
- Frontal lobe
  - Cortex
    - Primary motor cortex (Precentral gyrus, M1)
    - Premotor cortex
    - Supplementary motor cortex
    - Prefrontal cortex
      - Orbitofrontal cortex
      - Dorsolateral prefrontal cortex
      - Ventrolateral prefrontal cortex
      - Dorsomedial prefrontal cortex
      - Ventromedial prefrontal cortex
  - Gyri
    - Superior frontal gyrus
    - Middle frontal gyrus
    - Inferior frontal gyrus
  - Brodmann areas: 4, 6, 8, 9, 10, 11, 12, 24, 25, 32, 33, 44, 45, 46, 47
- Parietal lobe
  - Cortex
    - Primary somatosensory cortex (S1)
    - Secondary somatosensory cortex (S2)
    - Posterior parietal cortex
  - Gyri
    - Postcentral gyrus (Primary somesthetic area)
  - Other
    - Precuneus
  - Brodmann areas: 1, 2, 3 (Primary somesthetic area); 5, 7, 23, 26, 29, 31, 39, 40
- Occipital lobe
  - Cortex
    - Primary visual cortex (V1)
    - V2
    - V3
    - V4
  - Gyri
    - Lateral occipital gyrus
  - Other
    - Cuneus
  - Brodmann areas: 17 (primary visual cortex, V1); 18, 19
- Temporal lobe
  - Cortex
    - Primary auditory cortex (A1)
    - Secondary auditory cortex (A2)
    - Inferior temporal cortex
    - V5/MT
    - Posterior inferior temporal cortex
  - Gyri
    - Superior temporal gyrus
    - Middle temporal gyrus
    - Inferior temporal gyrus
    - Entorhinal cortex
    - Perirhinal cortex
    - Parahippocampal gyrus
    - Fusiform gyrus
  - Brodmann areas: 20, 21, 22, 27, 34, 35, 36, 37, 38, 41, 42
  - Other
    - Medial superior temporal area (MST)
- Insular cortex
- Cingulate cortex
  - Anterior cingulate
  - Posterior cingulate
  - Retrosplenial cortex
  - Indusium griseum
  - Subgenual area 25
  - Brodmann areas: 23, 24; 26, 29, 30 (retrosplenial areas); 31, 32

== Neural pathways ==
- Superior longitudinal fasciculus
  - Arcuate fasciculus
- Uncinate fasciculus
- Perforant pathway
- Thalamocortical radiations
- Corpus callosum
- Anterior commissure
- Amygdalofugal pathway
- Interthalamic adhesion
- Posterior commissure
- Habenular commissure
- Fornix
- Mammillotegmental fasciculus
- Incertohypothalamic pathway
- Cerebral peduncle
- Medial forebrain bundle
- Medial longitudinal fasciculus
- Myoclonic triangle
- Solitary tract
- Major dopaminergic pathways from dopaminergic cell groups
  - Mesocortical pathway
  - Mesolimbic pathway
  - Nigrostriatal pathway
  - Tuberoinfundibular pathway
- Serotonergic pathways
  - Raphe Nuclei
- Norepinephrine Pathways
  - Locus coeruleus and other noradrenergic cell groups
- Epinephrine pathways from adrenergic cell groups
- Glutamate and acetylcholine pathways from mesopontine nuclei

=== Motor systems / Descending fibers ===
- Extrapyramidal system
- Pyramidal tract
  - Corticospinal tract or Cerebrospinal fibers
    - Lateral corticospinal tract
    - Anterior corticospinal tract
  - Corticopontine fibers
    - Frontopontine fibers
    - Temporopontine fibers
  - Corticobulbar tract
- Corticomesencephalic tract
- Tectospinal tract
- Interstitiospinal tract
- Rubrospinal tract
- Rubro-olivary tract
- Olivocerebellar tract
- Olivospinal tract
- Vestibulospinal tract
  - Lateral vestibulospinal tract
  - Medial vestibulospinal tract
- Reticulospinal tract
- Lateral raphespinal tract
- Alpha system
- Gamma system

=== Somatosensory system ===
- Dorsal column–medial lemniscus pathway
  - Gracile fasciculus
  - Cuneate fasciculus
  - Medial lemniscus
- Spinothalamic tract
  - Lateral spinothalamic tract
  - Anterior spinothalamic tract
  - Spinomesencephalic tract
- Spinocerebellar tract
- Spino-olivary tract
- Spinoreticular tract

=== Visual system ===
- Optic tract
- Optic radiation
- Retinohypothalamic tract

=== Auditory system ===
- Medullary striae of fourth ventricle
- Trapezoid body
- Lateral lemniscus

=== Nerves ===
- Brain stem
  - Cranial nerves
    - Terminal (0)
    - Olfactory (I)
    - Optic (II)
    - Oculomotor (III)
    - Trochlear (IV)
    - Trigeminal (V)
    - Abducens (VI)
    - Facial (VII)
    - Vestibulocochlear (VIII)
    - Glossopharyngeal (IX)
    - Vagus (X)
    - Accessory (XI)
    - Hypoglossal (XII)

== Neuroendocrine systems ==
- Hypothalamic–pituitary hormones
  - HPA axis – CRH; ACTH
  - HPG axis – GnRH; LH and FSH
  - HPT axis – TRH; TSH
  - HPS axis – GHRH; GH
  - HPP axis – Dopamine (inhibitor); Prolactin
- Hypothalamic–neurohypophyseal system

== Neurovascular systems ==
- Middle cerebral artery
- Posterior cerebral artery
- Anterior cerebral artery
- Vertebral artery
- Basilar artery
- Circle of Willis (arterial system)
- Blood–brain barrier
- Glymphatic system
- Venous systems
- Circumventricular organs

== Neurotransmitter pathways ==
- Noradrenaline system
- Dopamine system
- Serotonin system
- Cholinergic system
- GABA
- Neuropeptides
  - Opioid peptides
    - Endorphins
    - Enkephalins
    - Dynorphins
  - Oxytocin
  - Substance P

== Dural meningeal system ==
- Cerebrospinal Fluid
- Brain-cerebrospinal fluid barrier
- Meningeal coverings
  - Dura mater
  - Arachnoid mater
  - Pia mater
- Epidural space
- Subdural space
- Subarachnoid space
  - Arachnoid septum
  - Superior cistern
  - Cistern of lamina terminalis
  - Chiasmatic cistern
  - Interpeduncular cistern
  - Pontine cistern
  - Cisterna magna
  - Spinal subarachnoid space
- Ventricular system
  - Lateral ventricles
    - Angular bundle
    - Anterior horn
    - Body of lateral ventricle
    - Inferior horn
    - Posterior horn
      - Calcar avis
    - Subventricular zone
  - Third ventricle
  - Fourth ventricle
  - Foramina
    - Interventricular Foramina
    - Cerebral Aqueduct
    - Foramina of Luschka
    - Foramen of Magendie

== Limbic system ==
- Cortical areas:
  - Limbic lobe
  - Orbitofrontal cortex
  - Piriform cortex part of the olfactory system
  - Entorhinal cortex
  - Hippocampus and associated structures
  - Fornix and septal nuclei
- Subcortical areas:
  - Septal nuclei
  - Amygdala
  - Nucleus accumbens
- Diencephalic structures:
  - Hypothalamus
  - Mammillary bodies
  - Anterior nuclei of thalamus

Other areas that have been included in the limbic system include the:

- Stria medullaris
- Central gray and dorsal and ventral nuclei of Gudden

== Related topics ==
- Human brain
- Spinal cord
- Outline of the human nervous system
- List of nerves of the human body
