= List of thalamic nuclei =

- Thalamic nuclei: (left thalamus, left view); MNG = Midline nuclear group AN = Anterior nuclear group MD = Medial dorsal nucleus VNG = Ventral nuclear group VA = Ventral anterior nucleus VL = Ventral lateral nucleus VPL = Ventral posterolateral nucleus VPM = Ventral posteromedial nucleus LNG = Lateral nuclear group PUL = Pulvinar; MTh = Metathalamus; LG = Lateral geniculate nucleus MG = Medial geniculate nucleus

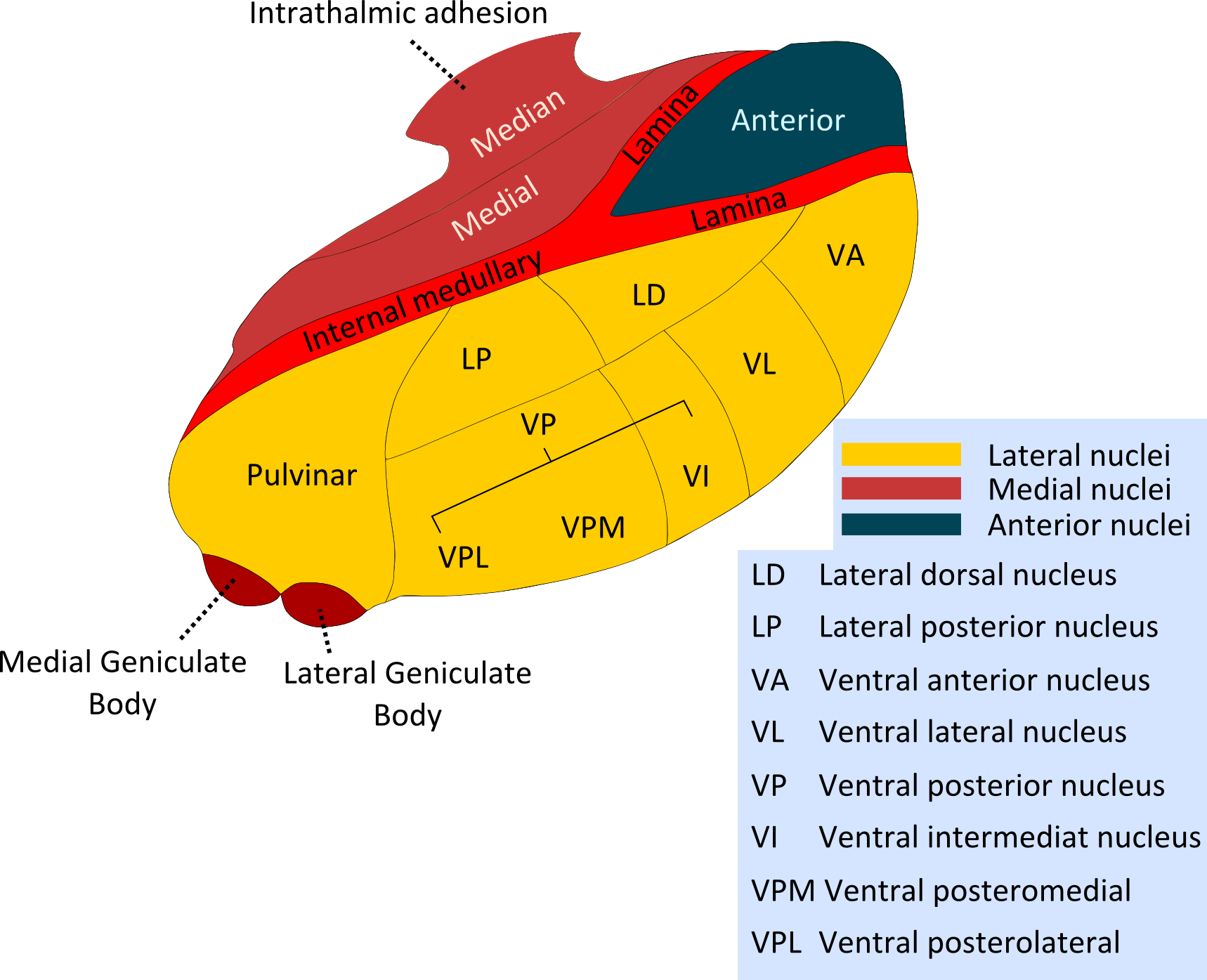
- Thalamic nuclei (right thalamus viewed from above right)

Identifiers
- MeSH: D013787
- TA98: A14.1.08.602

This traditional list does not accord strictly with human thalamic anatomy.

Nuclear groups of the thalamus include:

- anterior nuclear group (anteroventral, anterodorsal, anteromedial)
- medial nuclear group (medial dorsal nucleus, a.k.a. dorsomedial)
  - parvocellular part (a.k.a. parvicellular part)
  - magnocellular part
- midline nuclear group or paramedian
  - paratenial nucleus
  - paraventricular thalamus
  - reuniens nucleus (a.k.a. medioventral nucleus)
  - rhomboidal nucleus
  - interanteromedial
  - intermediodorsal
- intralaminar nuclear group
  - anterior (rostral) group
    - paracentral nucleus
    - central lateral nucleus
    - central medial nucleus (not called "centromedial")
  - posterior (caudal) intralaminar group
    - centromedian nucleus
    - parafascicular nucleus
- lateral nuclear group is replaced by
  - posterior region
    - pulvinar
      - anterior pulvinar nucleus
      - lateral pulvinar nucleus
      - medial pulvinar nucleus
      - inferior pulvinar nucleus
    - lateral posterior nucleus belongs to pulvinar
    - lateral dorsal nucleus (a.k.a. dorsal superficial nucleus)
  - ventral nuclear group
    - ventral anterior nucleus
    - ventral lateral nucleus
      - ventral medial (a.k.a. medial part of ventral lateral nucleus)
      - anterior ventral lateral
      - posterior ventral lateral
    - ventral posterior nucleus or ventrobasal complex
      - ventral posterolateral nucleus
        - oral part of the ventral posterolateral nucleus
        - caudal part of the ventral posterolateral nucleus
      - ventral posteromedial nucleus
      - ventral posteroinferior nucleus (probably same as ventral intermediate nucleus)
- metathalamus
  - medial geniculate body
  - lateral geniculate body
- thalamic reticular nucleus part of the ventral thalamus

== Related topics ==
- Human brain
- Outline of the human nervous system
- List of regions in the human brain
