= Medial pulvinar nucleus =

Part of the thalamus

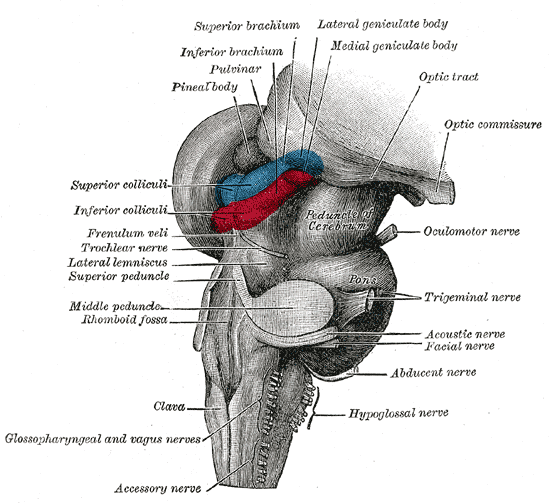
- Hind- and mid-brains; postero-lateral view. (Pulvinar visible near top.)

- Thalamic nuclei: MNG = Midline nuclear group AN = Anterior nuclear group MD = Medial dorsal nucleus VNG = Ventral nuclear group VA = Ventral anterior nucleus VL = Ventral lateral nucleus VPL = Ventral posterolateral nucleus VPM = Ventral posteromedial nucleus LNG = Lateral nuclear group PUL = Pulvinar; MTh = Metathalamus; LG = Lateral geniculate nucleus MG = Medial geniculate nucleus

Details
- Part of: pulvinar

Identifiers
- Latin: nucleus pulvinaris medialis

Medial pulvinar nucleus (nucleus pulvinaris medialis) is one of four traditionally anatomically distinguished nuclei of the pulvinar of the thalamus. The other three nuclei of the pulvinar are called lateral, inferior and anterior pulvinar nuclei.

== Connections ==
=== Afferent ===
- Medial pulvinar nucleus, together with its lateral and inferior nuclei, receives afferent input from superior colliculus.
- Medial pulvinar nucleus also receives many afferent inputs from different cortical areas, including cingulate, posterior parietal, premotor and prefrontal cortical areas. This is the pattern of input connections typical for association relay nuclei of the thalamus.

=== Efferent ===
- Medial pulvinar nucleus sends its widespread projections to the different areas of association cortex, including cingulate, posterior parietal, premotor and prefrontal cortical areas. This is the pattern of output connections typical for association relay nuclei of the thalamus.

== Functions ==
- Medial pulvinar nucleus, together with its lateral and inferior nuclei, is thought to be important for the initiation and compensation of saccadic movements of the eyes. Those nuclei also participate in the visual attention regulation.
- Medial pulvinar nucleus is also thought to participate in the process of integration and association of information received from different sensory modalities (multisensory or multimodal integration), and also in the process of integration and coordination of sensor input and its corresponding motor response (sensorimotor integration).

== Clinical significance ==
Lesions of the medial pulvinar nucleus can result in neglect syndromes and attentional deficits while preserved connectivity to the medial pulvinar has been implicated in blindsight abilities.
