= Anterior pulvinar nucleus =

Thalamic nucleus

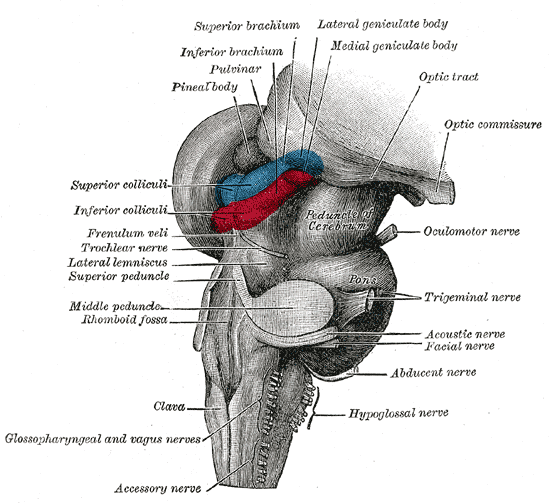
- Hind- and mid-brains; postero-lateral view. (Pulvinar visible near top.)

- Thalamic nuclei: MNG = Midline nuclear group AN = Anterior nuclear group MD = Medial dorsal nucleus VNG = Ventral nuclear group VA = Ventral anterior nucleus VL = Ventral lateral nucleus VPL = Ventral posterolateral nucleus VPM = Ventral posteromedial nucleus LNG = Lateral nuclear group PUL = Pulvinar; MTh = Metathalamus; LG = Lateral geniculate nucleus MG = Medial geniculate nucleus

Details
- Part of: pulvinar

Identifiers
- Latin: nucleus pulvinaris anterior

Anterior pulvinar nucleus (nucleus pulvinaris anterior) is one of four traditionally anatomically distinguished nuclei of the pulvinar of the thalamus. The other three nuclei of the pulvinar are called lateral, inferior and medial pulvinar nuclei.
