= Lateral posterior nucleus of thalamus =

- Thalamic nuclei: MNG = Midline nuclear group AN = Anterior nuclear group MD = Medial dorsal nucleus VNG = Ventral nuclear group VA = Ventral anterior nucleus VL = Ventral lateral nucleus VPL = Ventral posterolateral nucleus VPM = Ventral posteromedial nucleus LNG = Lateral nuclear group PUL = Pulvinar; MTh = Metathalamus; LG = Lateral geniculate nucleus MG = Medial geniculate nucleus

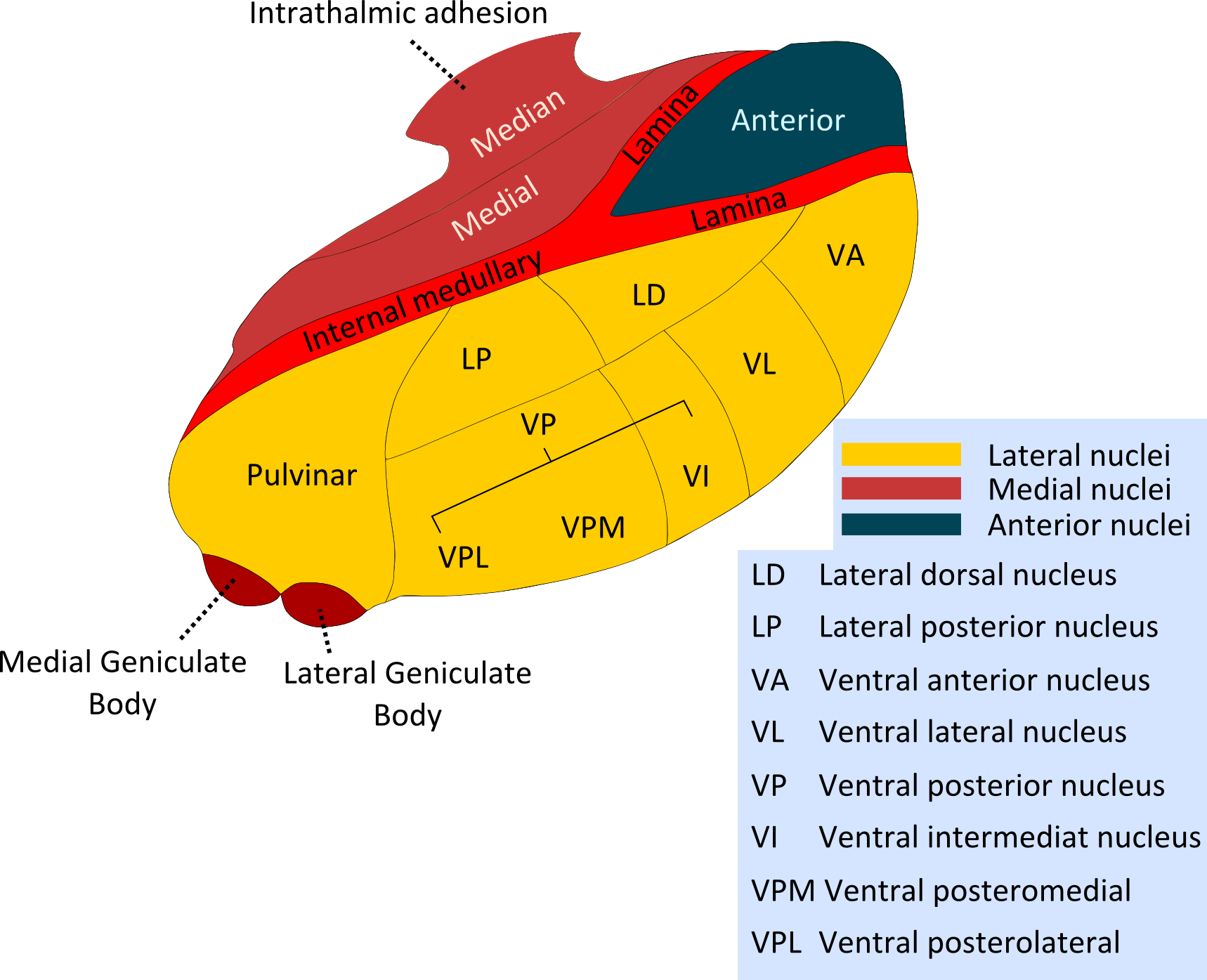
- Thalamic nuclei

Details

Identifiers
- Latin: nucleus lateralis posterior thalami
- NeuroLex ID: birnlex_835
- TA98: A14.1.08.609
- TA2: 5697
- FMA: 62177

The lateral posterior nucleus is a nucleus of the thalamus. It represents the rostral continuation of the pulvinar (with which it shares comparable connections - the two may be considered a complex). It is thought to be involved in complex sensory integration.

== Anatomy ==
=== Connections ===
Additional connections include the: inferior parietal lobule, cingulate cortex, and medial portion of parahippocampal gyrus.

==== Afferents ====
Afferents of the LPN project from the: occipital lobe, precuneus, superior parietal lobule, pretectal area, and superior colliculus.

==== Efferents ====
The LPN issues efferents to the precuneus, superior parietal lobule, temporal lobe, and visual association area.

== Other animals ==
In rodents, the lateral posterior nucleus is considered the homologue of the primate pulvinar.
