= Ventral nucleus =

Ventral nucleus may refer to:

- Ventral lateral nucleus, a nucleus of the thalamus. It receives neuronal inputs from the basal nuclei which includes the substantia nigra
- Ventral reticular nucleus, a continuation of the parvocellular nucleus in the brainstem
- Ventral posteromedial nucleus, a nucleus of the thalamus
- Ventral posterolateral nucleus, a nucleus of the thalamus
- Ventral anterior nucleus, a nucleus of the thalamus
- Ventral posterior nucleus, a somato-sensory relay nucleus in thalamus of the brain
