= Thalamocortical radiations =

Neural pathways between the thalamus and cerebral cortex

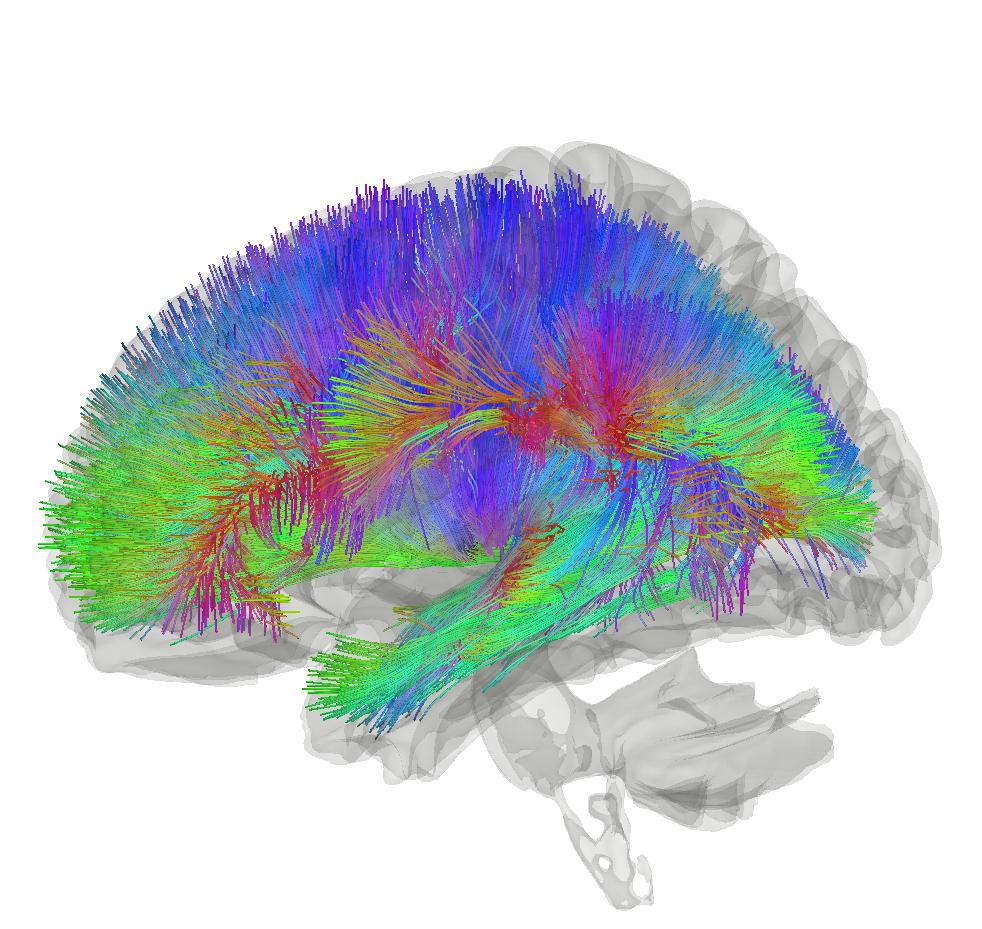
- Tractography of thalamocortical radiations

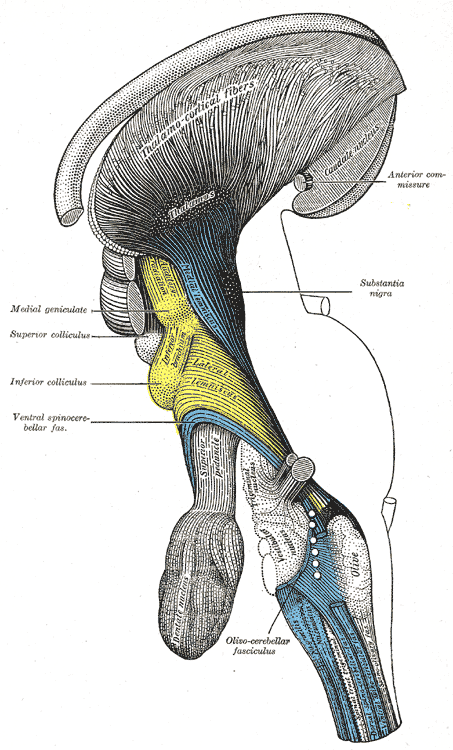
- Deep dissection of brainstem. Lateral view. (Thalamocortical fibers labeled at center top.)

Details
- From: Thalamus
- To: Cortex

Identifiers
- Latin: radiatio thalamocorticalis, tractus thalamocorticalis
- NeuroNames: 1337

In neuroanatomy, thalamocortical radiations, also known as thalamocortical fibers, are the efferent fibers that project from the thalamus to distinct areas of the cerebral cortex. They form fiber bundles that emerge from the lateral surface of the thalamus.

== Structure ==
Thalamocortical fibers (TC fibers) have been referred to as one of the two constituents of the isothalamus, the other being microneurons. Thalamocortical fibers have a bush or tree-like appearance as they extend into the internal capsule and project to the layers of the cortex.

The thalamus supplies all parts of the neocortex with afferents. The main thalamocortical fibers extend from different nuclei of the thalamus and project to the visual cortex, somatosensory (and associated sensori-motor) cortex, and the auditory cortex in the brain. Thalamocortical radiations also innervate gustatory and olfactory pathways, as well as pre-frontal motor areas. Visual input from the optic tract is processed by the lateral geniculate nucleus of the thalamus, auditory input in the medial geniculate nucleus, and somatosensory input in the ventral posterior nucleus of the thalamus. Thalamic nuclei project to cortical areas of distinct architectural organization and relay the processed information back to the area of original activity in the thalamus via corticothalamic fibers (CT fibers).

=== Corticothalamic feedback ===
The thalamic reticular nucleus (TRN) receives incoming signals via corticothalamic pathways and regulates activity within the thalamus accordingly. Corticothalamic feedback neurons are mostly found in layer VI of the cortex. Reciprocal CT projections to the thalamus are of a higher order than, and synapse with, the TRN in much greater number than do thalamocortical projections to cortex. This suggests that the cortex has a much bigger role in top down processing and regulation of thalamic activity than do the processes originating in thalamic interneurons. Large-scale frequency oscillations and electrical rhythms have also been shown to regulate TC activity for long periods of time, as is evident during the sleep cycle. Other evidence suggests CT modulation of TC rhythms can occur over different time scales, adding even more complexity to their function.

=== Relay cells ===
Thalamic interneurons process sensory information and signal different regions of the thalamic nuclei. These nuclei extend to relay cells, which in turn innervate distinct areas of the cortex via thalamocortical fibers. Either specifically or nonspecifically, TC relay cells project specifically to organized areas of the cortex directly and nonspecifically project to large areas of cortex through the innervation of many interconnected collateral axons.

According to Jones (2001) there are two primary types of relay neurons in the thalamus of primates–core cells and matrix cells–each creating distinct pathways to various parts and layers throughout the cerebral cortex. Matrix cells of the thalamus, or calbindin-immuno-reactive neurons (CIR neurons), are widely distributed and diffusely dispersed in each of the nuclei of the dorsal thalamus. In comparison, parvalbumin immuno-reactive neurons (PIR neurons) can be found only in principal sensory and motor relay nuclei, and in the pulvinar nuclei as well as the intralaminar nuclei. The PIR neurons cluster together creating "densely terminating afferent fibers…forming a core imposed on a diffuse background matrix of PIR cells" (Jones 2001). PIR cells tend to project upon the cerebral cortex and terminate in an organized topographic manner in specifically localized zones (in deep layer III and in the middle layer IV). In contrast, CIR cells have dispersed projections wherein various adjacent cells connect to non-specific different cortical areas. CIR axons seem to terminate primarily in the superficial layers of the cortex: layers I, II, and upper III.

== Function ==
Thalamocortical signaling is primarily excitatory, causing the activation of corresponding areas of the cortex, but is mainly regulated by inhibitory mechanisms. The specific excitatory signaling is based upon glutamatergic signaling, and is dependent on the nature of the sensory information being processed. Recurrent oscillations in thalamocortical circuits also provide large-scale regulatory feedback inputs to the thalamus via GABAergic neurons that synapse in the TRN. In a study done by Gibbs, Zhang, Shumate, and Coulter (1998) it was found that endogenously released zinc blocked GABA responses within the TC system specifically by interrupting communication between the thalamus and the connected TRN.

Computational neuroscientists are particularly interested in thalamocortical circuits because they represent a structure that is disproportionally larger and more complex in humans than other mammals (when body size is taken into account), which may contribute to humans' special cognitive abilities. Evidence from one study (Arcelli et al. 1996) offers partial support to this claim by suggesting that thalamic GABAergic local circuit neurons in mammalian brains relate more to processing ability compared to sensorimotor ability, as they reflect an increasing complexity of local information processing in the thalamus. It is proposed that core relay cells and matrix cells projecting from the dorsal thalamus allow for synchronization of cortical and thalamic cells during "high-frequency oscillations that underlie discrete conscious events", though this is a heavily debated area of research.

=== Projections ===
The majority of thalamocortical fibers project to layer IV of the cortex, wherein sensory information is directed to other layers where they either terminate or connect with axons collaterally, depending on the type of projection and type of initial activation. Activation of the thalamocortical neurons relies heavily on the direct and indirect effects of glutamate, which causes excitatory postsynaptic potentials (EPSPs) at terminal branches in the primary sensory cortices.

=== Somatosensory areas ===
Primarily, thalamocortical somatosensory radiation from the VPL, VPM and LP nuclei extends to the primary and secondary somatosensory areas, terminating in cortical layers of the lateral postcentral gyrus. S1 receives parallel thalamocortical radiations from the posterior medial nucleus and the VPN. Projections from the VPN to the postcentral gyrus account for the transfer of sensory information concerning touch and pain. Several studies indicate that parallel innervations to S1 and also S2 via thalamocortical pathways result in the processing of nociceptive and non-nociceptive information. Non-specific projections to sensori-motor areas of the cortex may in part have to do with the relationship between non-noci-receptive processing and motor functions.

Past research shows a link between S1 and M1, creating a thalamocortical sensori-motor circuit. When this circuit becomes disrupted symptoms are produced similar to those that accompany multiple sclerosis, suggesting thalamocortical rhythms are involved in regulating sensori-motor pathways in a highly specialized manner. TC-CT rhythms evident during sleep act to inhibit these thalamocortical fibers so as to maintain the tonic cycling of low frequency waves and the subsequent suppression of motor activity.

=== Visual areas ===
The lateral geniculate nucleus and the pulvinar nuclei project to and terminate in V1, and carry motor information from the brain stem as well as other sensory input from the optic tract. The visual cortex connects with other sensory areas which allows for the integration of cognitive tasks such as selective and directed attention, and pre-motor planning, in relation to the processing of incoming visual stimuli. Models of the pulvinar projections to the visual cortex have been proposed by several imaging studies, though their mapping has been difficult due to the fact that pulvinar subdivisions are not conventionally organized and have been difficult to visualize using structural MRI. Evidence from several studies supports the idea that the pulvinar nuclei and superior colliculus receive descending projections from CT fibers while TC fibers extending from the LGN carry visual information to the various areas of the visual cortex near the calcarine fissure.

=== Auditory areas ===
Thalamocortical axons project primarily from the medial geniculate nucleus via the sublenticular region of the internal capsule, and terminate in an organized topographic manner in the transverse temporal gyri. MMGN radiations terminate in specific locations while thalamocortical fibers from the VMGN terminate in nonspecific clusters of cells and form collateral connections to neighboring cells.

Research done by staining the brains of macaque monkeys reveals projections from the ventral nucleus, mainly terminating in layers IV and IIIB, with some nonspecific clusters of PIR cells terminating in layers I, II, IIIA, and VI. Fibers from the dorsal nuclei were found to project more directly to the primary auditory area, with most axons terminating in layer IIIB. The magnocellular nucleus projected a small amount of PIR cells with axons mainly terminating in layer 1, though large regions of the middle cortical layers were innervated through collaterally connected CIR neurons. Past research suggests that the thalamocortical-auditory pathway may be the only neural correlate that can explain a direct translation of frequency information to the cortex via specific pathways.

=== Motor areas ===
The primary motor cortex receives terminating thalamocortical fibers from the VL nucleus of the thalamus. This is the primary pathway involved in the transference of cerebellar input to the primary motor cortex. The VA projects widely across the inferior parietal and premotor cortex. Other non-specific thalamocortical projections, those that originate in the dorsal-medial nuclei of the thalamus, terminate in the prefrontal cortex and have subsequent projections to associative premotor areas via collateral connections. The cortico-basal ganglia-thalamo-cortical loop has been traditionally associated with reward-learning, and though has also been noted by some researchers to have a modulatory effect on thalamocortical network functioning, this is due to inherent activation of the premotor areas connecting the VA nucleus with the cortex.

== Clinical significance ==
=== Absence seizures ===
Thalamocortical radiations have been researched extensively in the past due to their relationship with attention, wakefulness, and arousal. Past research has shown how an increase in spike-and-wave activity within the TC network can disrupt normal rhythms involved with the sleep-wakefulness cycle, ultimately causing absence seizures and other forms of epileptic behavior. Burst firing within a part of the TC network stimulates GABA receptors within the thalamus, causing moments of increased inhibition, leading to frequency spikes, which offset oscillation patterns.

Another study done on rats suggests that during spike-and-wave seizures, thalamic rhythms are mediated by local thalamic connections, while the cortex controls the synchronization of these rhythms over extended periods of time. Thalamocortical dysrhythmia is a term associated with spontaneously reoccurring low frequency spike-and-wave activity in the thalamus, which causes symptoms normally associated with impulse control disorders such as obsessive compulsive disorder, Parkinson's disease, attention deficit hyperactivity disorder, and other forms of chronic psychosis. Other evidence has shown how reductions in the distribution of connections of nonspecific thalamocortical systems is heavily associated with loss of consciousness, as can be seen with individuals in a vegetative state, or coma.

=== Prefrontal lobotomy ===
The bilateral interruption or severing of the connection between thalamocortical radiations and the medial and anterior thalamic nuclei results in a prefrontal lobotomy, which causes a drastic personality change and a subdued behavioral disposition without cortical injury.

== Research ==
=== Evolutionary theories of consciousness ===
Theories of consciousness have been linked to thalamocortical rhythm oscillations in TC-CT pathway activity. One such theory, the dynamic core theory of conscious experience, proposes four main pillars in support of conscious awareness as a consequence of dorsal thalamic activity:

1. the results of cortical computations underlay consciousness
2. vegetative states and general anesthetics work primarily to disrupt normal thalamic functioning
3. the anatomy and physiology of the thalamus implies consciousness
4. neural synchronization accounts for the neural basis of consciousness.

This area of research is still developing, and most current theories are either partial or incomplete.
