= Ventral posterior nucleus =

- Thalamic nuclei: MNG = Midline nuclear group AN = Anterior nuclear group MD = Medial dorsal nucleus VNG = Ventral nuclear group VA = Ventral anterior nucleus VL = Ventral lateral nucleus VPL = Ventral posterolateral nucleus VPM = Ventral posteromedial nucleus LNG = Lateral nuclear group PUL = Pulvinar; MTh = Metathalamus; LG = Lateral geniculate nucleus MG = Medial geniculate nucleus

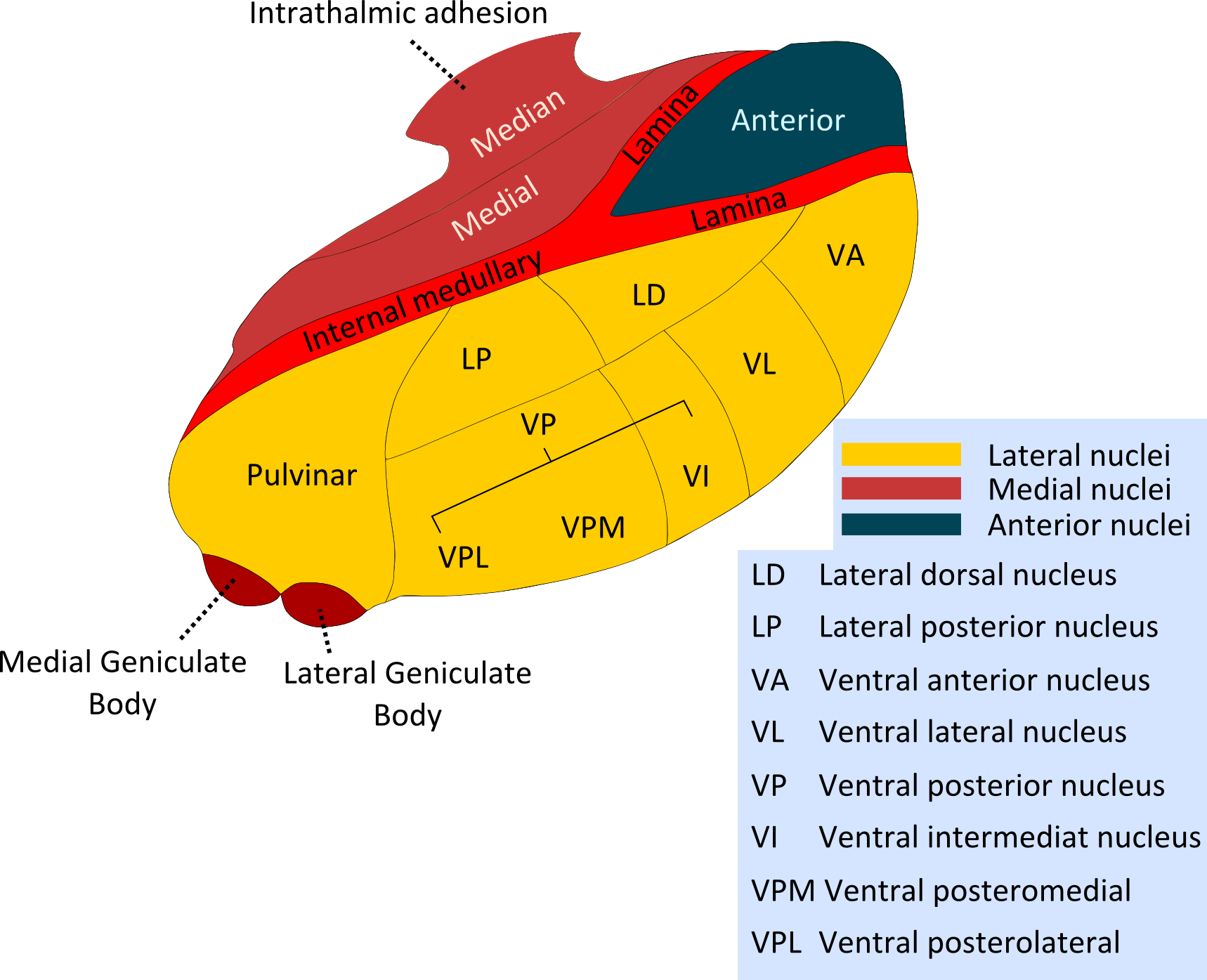
- Thalamic nuclei

Details
- Part of: Thalamus

Identifiers
- Latin: Nucleus ventralis posterior
- NeuroNames: 343
- NeuroLex ID: birnlex_1116

The ventral posterior nucleus is the somatosensory relay nucleus in thalamus of the brain.

== Input and output ==
The ventral posterior nucleus receives neuronal input from the medial lemniscus, spinothalamic tracts, and trigeminothalamic tract. It projects to the somatosensory cortex and the ascending reticuloactivation system.

== Subdivisions ==
The ventral posterior nucleus is divided into:

- Ventral posterolateral nucleus, which receives sensory information from the body via the medial lemniscus, and spinothalamic tracts.
- Ventral posteromedial nucleus, which receives sensory information from the head and face via the trigeminal nerve.
- Ventral intermediate nucleus, implicated in oscillatory tremor generation in Parkinson's disease and essential tremor.

== Function ==
The ventral posterior nucleus has, by virtue of its afferent and efferent pathways, crucial relay and regulatory roles in touch, body position, pain, temperature, itch, taste, and arousal. Additionally, the VPN—and particularly the ventral intermediate nucleus of the VPN—have been implicated in the pathophysiology and modulation of oscillatory tremors as found in Parkinson's disease and essential tremor; accordingly, it is a target of deep brain stimulation in the treatment of such pathologies. The posterior subthalamic area is suggested to be a better target than the VIM.

== Additional images ==
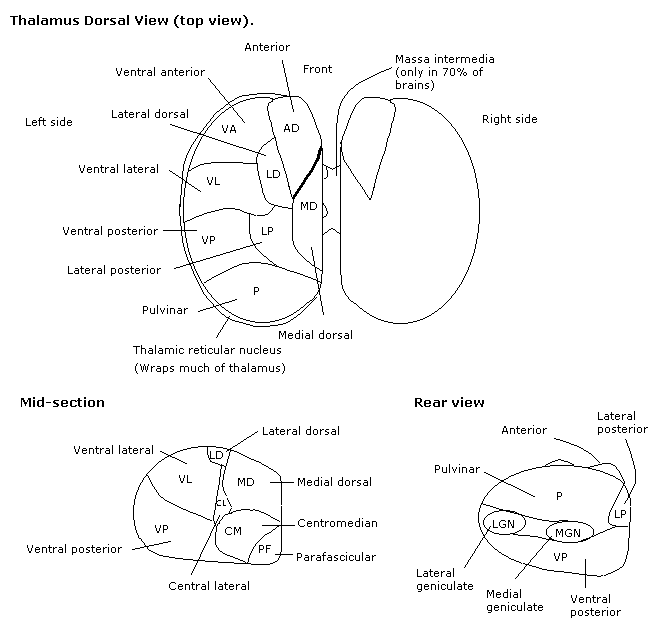
Thalamus

Left thalamus viewed from upper left posterior
