= Anterolateral region of the motor thalamus =

Anterolateral region of the motor thalamus is a composite substructure of the ventral nuclear group of the thalamus based on connectivity and function. It includes the ventral anterior nucleus and the medial part of the ventral lateral nucleus which receive projections primarily from the substantia nigra. It, the anteromedial region of the motor thalamus and the posterior region of the motor thalamus constitute the motor thalamus.
