= Dorsal nucleus =

Dorsal nucleus may refer to:

- Dorsal cochlear nucleus, a cortex-like structure on the dorso-lateral surface of the brainstem
- Dorsal nucleus of vagus nerve, a cranial nerve nucleus for the vagus nerve
- Dorsal raphe nucleus
- Lateral dorsal nucleus of thalamus
- Medial dorsal nucleus of thalamus
- Posterior thoracic nucleus (or dorsal nucleus), is a group of interneurons found in the medial part of Lamina VII
