= Dorsal nucleus of thalamus =

Dorsal nucleus of thalamus may refer to:

- Lateral dorsal nucleus of thalamus
- Medial dorsal nucleus of thalamus
