= Ventrobasal complex =

Relay center of the thalamus for nociceptive stimuli

Details

Identifiers
- Latin: nuclei ventrobasales
- TA98: A14.1.08.640
- TA2: 5691
- FMA: 77794

The ventrobasal complex (VB) is a relay nucleus of the thalamus for nociceptive stimuli received from nociceptive nerves. The VB consists of the ventral posteromedial nucleus (VPM) and the ventral posterolateral nucleus (VPL). In some species, the ventral posterolateral nucleus, pars caudalis is also a part of the VB. The VB gets inputs from the spinothalamic tract, medial lemniscus, and corticothalamic tract. The main output of the VB is the primary somatosensory cortex.

The VB serves as the main relay for nociceptive stimuli and the modulation of that stimuli to the primary somatosensory cortex. The modulation occurs through different types of receptors present in the VB.

== VB Inputs ==
Spinothalamic tract (STT) cells that project from laminae I and V in the lumbosacral area of the spinal cord project to the VPL in the VB. STT cells located in the cervical area of the spinal cord are the densest and project from the neck of the dorsal horn to the VPL of the VB. Most projections to the VB are contralateral while only a few projections to the VB are ipsilateral.

Excitatory inputs to the VB are medial lemniscal (ML) and corticothalamic (CT) glutamatergic synapses. The ML is a sensory afferent input and the CT is from layer VI of the primary sensory cortex.

The VB also gets inputs from areas in the brain stem which release acetylcholine (ACh) that can modulate activity in the VB.

== VB Outputs ==
The VB has outputs to the primary somatosensory cortex.

== VB Neurons ==
There are two types of nociceptive neurons that provide input to the VB: nociceptive specific (NS) neurons and wide dynamic range neuron (WDR).

NS neurons respond specifically to a noxious mechanical stimulus, whereas WDR neurons respond to a graded mechanical stimulus. NS and WDR neurons within the VB are somatotopically organized. NS neurons are located more caudally in the VB, while WDR neurons are located more rostrally. All inputs into the VB are contralateral and have two different receptive fields within the VB. The VPM receptive field receives input from the contralateral trigeminal nerve and the VPL receptive field receives input from the contralateral spinal nerve. Each have NS and WDR neurons but terminate either caudally or rostrally respectively.

== VB Modulation ==
=== Nicotinic ACh Receptors ===
Nicotinic acetylcholine receptors (nAChRs) are present in the VB. Each nAChR can be made up of different subunits which can cause the receptor to respond to different stimuli. In the VB, nAChRs can contain the subunits α4, α5, α7, and β2. nAChRs that are made up of (α4β2)_{2}α5 are of interest because they decrease neurotransmitter release for corticothalamic (CT) synapses. When nAChRs are activated there is a decrease in synaptic transmission of glutamate from CT neurons. When CT synaptic transmission is decreased by activation of the nAChRs then the activated nAChRs in the VB can selectively enhance information to the somatosensory cortex through the medial lemniscal tract.

=== Mu-opioid Receptors ===
μ-opioid receptor (MORs) are inhibitory receptors that can cause a decrease in pain if activated and are expressed in the VB especially in the VPL. When MORs are activated, by an agonist like DAMGO for example, pain-related behaviors are decreased for a certain amount of time. After 45 minutes rats that were given DAMGO show signs of increased pain behaviors suggesting that opiates activate a pronociceptive system which can lead to increased pain sensitivity after only having one dose of opiates administered. Decrease in pain-related behaviors can be attributed to the activation of MORs in the VB which activates an inhibitory circuit for pain by decreasing the amount or quality of information relayed to the somatosensory cortex. However, there is a complex mechanism between MORs and other receptors in the VB that can lead to a decrease in pain-related behaviors and thus further research is needed to understand exactly how this mechanism works.

=== GABA_{B} Receptors ===
GABA_{B} receptors are located in the VB. If a receptor is located presynaptically when activated it causes the suppression of neurotransmitter release. If the receptor is located postsynaptically then when activated it causes inhibitory postsynaptic potential. When GABA_{B} receptors are activated or blocked by baclofen (agonist) or CGP35348 (antagonist) respectively there is a decrease in pain-related behaviors in a dose-dependent manner. That is, there is less pain-related behavior if a higher dose is given. It is not known if this mechanism is occurring presynaptically or postsynaptically. Further research is needed to distinguish between where the inhibition is being mediated.
