= Paratenial nucleus =

Details
- Part of: Midline nuclear group

Identifiers
- Latin: nucleus parataenialis thalami
- NeuroNames: 324
- NeuroLex ID: birnlex_860
- FMA: 62151

The paratenial nucleus, or parataenial nucleus (Latin: nucleus parataenialis), is a component of the midline nuclear group in the thalamus. It is sometimes subdivided into the nucleus parataenialis interstitialis and nucleus parataenialis parvocellularis (Hassler). It is located above the bordering paraventricular nucleus of thalamus and below the anterodorsal nucleus.

The paratenial nucleus, like other midline nuclei, receives inputs from a large number of regions in the brainstem, hypothalamus and limbic system. It projects back to an equally wide range, but in a fairly specific manner (in the past, the midline nuclei have often been described as "nonspecific" because of their global effects). Particular targets include medial frontal polar cortex, the anterior cingulate, insula, the piriform and entorhinal cortices, the ventral subiculum, claustrum, the core and shell of nucleus accumbens, the medial striatum, the bed nucleus of stria terminalis, and caudal parts of the central and basal nuclei of amygdala.

While the exact function of the nucleus is uncertain, its connectivity suggests that it (and the periventricular nucleus) may act as a gateway for multimodal information to the limbic system used in selecting appropriate responses. This might include high incentive values of food triggering feeding behaviour even when satiated. Conversely, the midline nuclei may also play a role in retrieving consolidated fear conditioning through the projection to the central nucleus of the amygdala.
