= Sublingual nucleus =

Neuron cluster of the medulla

Details

Identifiers
- Latin: nucleus sublingualis
- NeuroNames: 763
- NeuroLex ID: birnlex_2657

In the substance of the formatio reticularis are two small nuclei of gray matter. The one near the dorsal aspect of the hilus of the inferior olivary nucleus is called the Sublingual nucleus (inferior central nucleus, nucleus of Roller.)

== Function ==
The nucleus is proposed to play a role in gaze control, forming part of the SVN–PHN–Flocculus SVN circuit, and injury is suspected to underlie the upbeat form of nystagmus.
