= Olivospinal tract =

Hypothetical tract in the central nervous system

- Olivospinal tract is 2d, in red at bottom left.

Details

Identifiers
- Latin: tractus olivospinalis
- TA98: A14.1.02.213; A14.1.02.223
- FMA: 73992

The olivospinal tract had been described as a tract arising in the inferior olivary nucleus of the medulla oblongata to descend in the lateral funiculus of the spinal cord and modulate the activity of spinal anterior grey column motor neurons. Its existence is now strongly doubted.
