= Angular bundle =

In the brain, the angular bundle is a composite fiber tract within the ventrolateral aspect of the lateral ventricle's temporal horn. It contains the perforant path (the main input to the hippocampus, extending from the entorhinal cortex to dentate gyrus), along with several other fibers interconnecting the entorhinal cortex, parahippocampal gyrus, and associated areas.
