= Central lateral nucleus =

Part of the thalamus in the human brain

In the human brain, the central lateral nucleus is a part of the anterior intralaminar nucleus in the thalamus. The intralaminar nuclei project to many different regions of the brain,

The thalamus acts generally as a relay point for the brain for other areas of the brain to link to. The central lateral nucleus acts in a vital role in consciousness.
