= Nucleus reuniens =

Details

Identifiers
- Latin: nucleus reuniens
- NeuroNames: 309
- NeuroLex ID: birnlex_770
- TA98: A14.1.08.632
- FMA: 62153

The nucleus reuniens is a region of the thalamic midline nuclear group. In the human brain, it is located in the interthalamic adhesion (massa intermedia). It is also known as the medioventral nucleus.

The nucleus reuniens receives afferent input from a large number of structures, mainly from limbic and limbic-associated structures. It sends projections to the medial prefrontal cortex, the hippocampus, perirhinal cortex, and entorhinal cortex, although there exist sparse connections to many other afferent structures as well.

The unique medial prefrontal cortex and hippocampal connectivity allows reuniens to regulate neural traffic in this cortical network related to changes in an organism's attentiveness, making reuniens critical to associative learning, memory retrieval, memory generalization, spatial route planning, and resilience to stress.
