= Lateral nuclear group =

Group of thalamic nuclei

- Thalamic nuclei: (left thalamus, left view); MNG = Midline nuclear group AN = Anterior nuclear group MD = Medial dorsal nucleus VNG = Ventral nuclear group VA = Ventral anterior nucleus VL = Ventral lateral nucleus VPL = Ventral posterolateral nucleus VPM = Ventral posteromedial nucleus LNG = Lateral nuclear group PUL = Pulvinar; MTh = Metathalamus; LG = Lateral geniculate nucleus MG = Medial geniculate nucleus

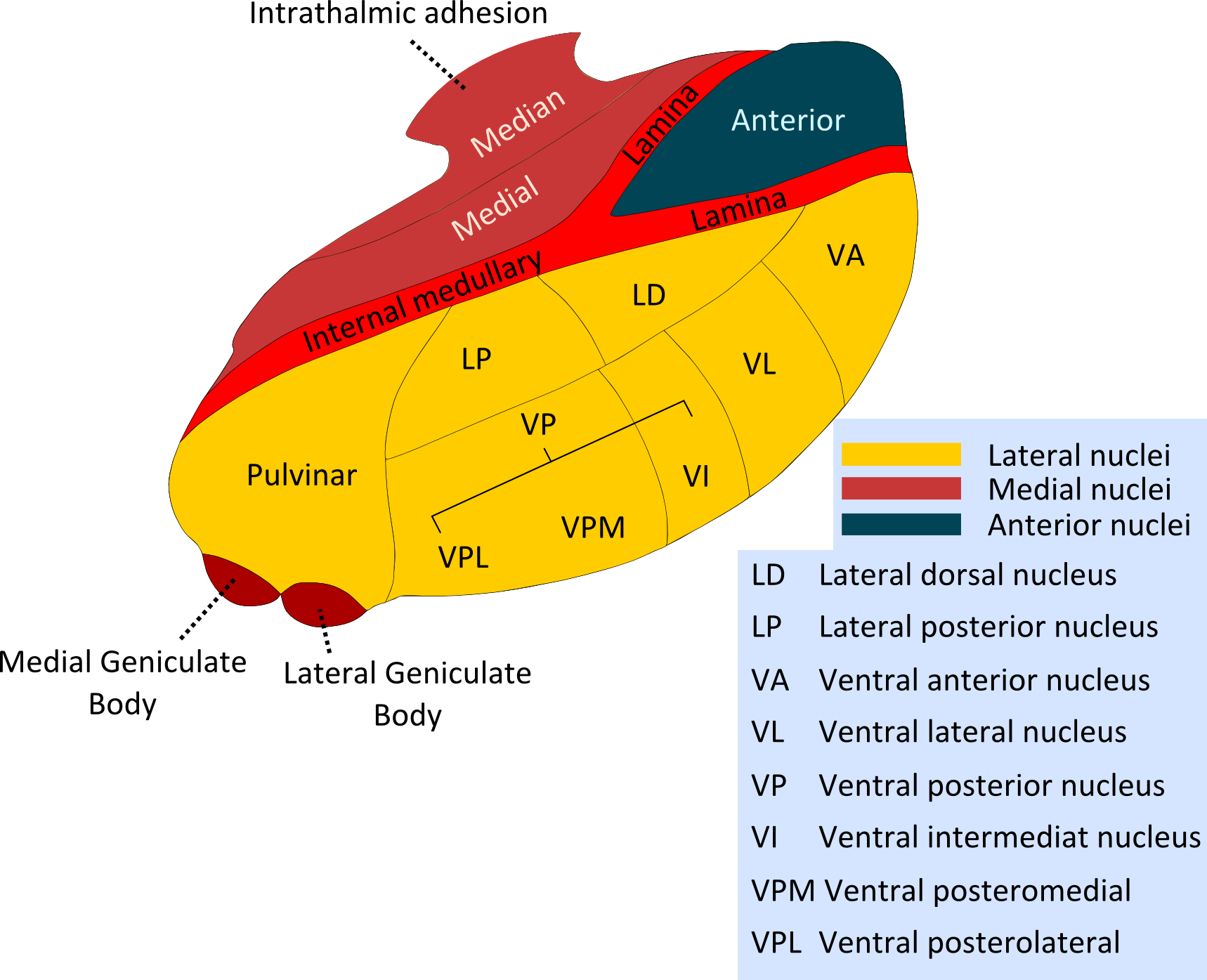
- Thalamic nuclei (right thalamus viewed from above right)

Identifiers
- MeSH: D020647
- NeuroNames: 325
- NeuroLex ID: birnlex_1537

The lateral nuclear group is a collection of nuclei on the lateral side of the thalamus. This nucleus group is one of the three regions of the thalamus which result from trisection by the Y-shaped internal medullary lamina.

The name "lateral nuclear group" is also given to a subset of the lateral group of nuclei which result from trisection by the internal medullary lamina. The lateral nuclear group consists of the following:

- lateral dorsal nucleus
- lateral posterior nucleus
- pulvinar nuclei

The lateral region of the thalamus which results from trisection by the internal medullary lamina also includes the ventral nuclear group and the lateral and medial geniculate nuclei.
