= Lateral dorsal nucleus of thalamus =

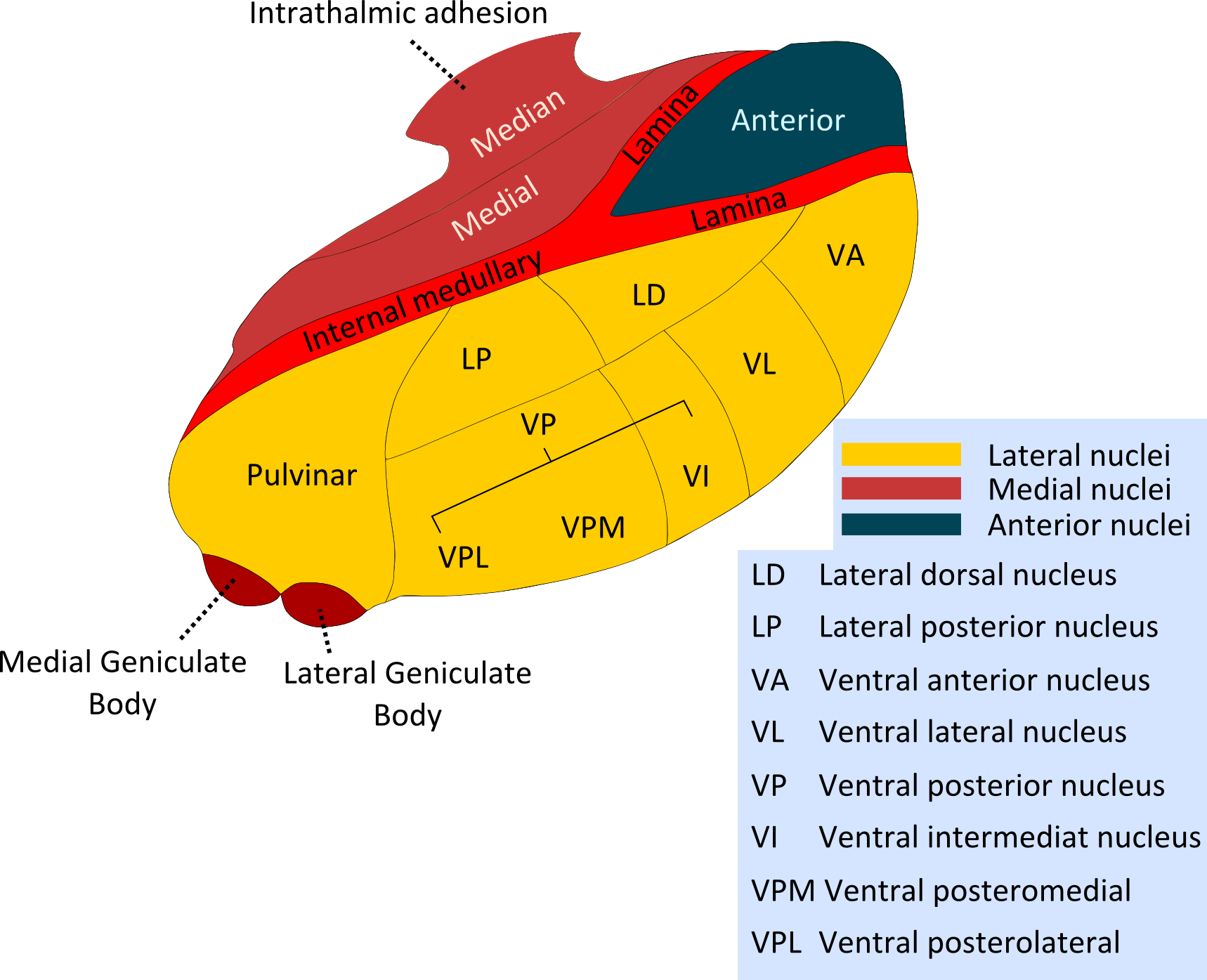
- Thalamic nuclei

Details

Identifiers
- Latin: nucleus dorsalis lateralis
- NeuroNames: 326
- TA98: A14.1.08.608
- TA2: 5696
- FMA: 62176

The lateral dorsal nucleus is a nucleus of the thalamus. It is the most anterior of the dorsal lateral nuclei. It is also known as the dorsal superficial nucleus.

It acts in concert with the anterior nuclei of thalamus.

It receives significant input from several subdivisions of visual cortex, and has a primary output to parietal cortex on the dorsolateral cortical convexity, giving it access to limbic forebrain nuclei important for emotion and behavior functions.
