= Ventral nuclear group =

- Thalamic nuclei: MNG = Midline nuclear group AN = Anterior nuclear group MD = Medial dorsal nucleus VNG = Ventral nuclear group VA = Ventral anterior nucleus VL = Ventral lateral nucleus VPL = Ventral posterolateral nucleus VPM = Ventral posteromedial nucleus LNG = Lateral nuclear group PUL = Pulvinar; MTh = Metathalamus; LG = Lateral geniculate nucleus MG = Medial geniculate nucleus

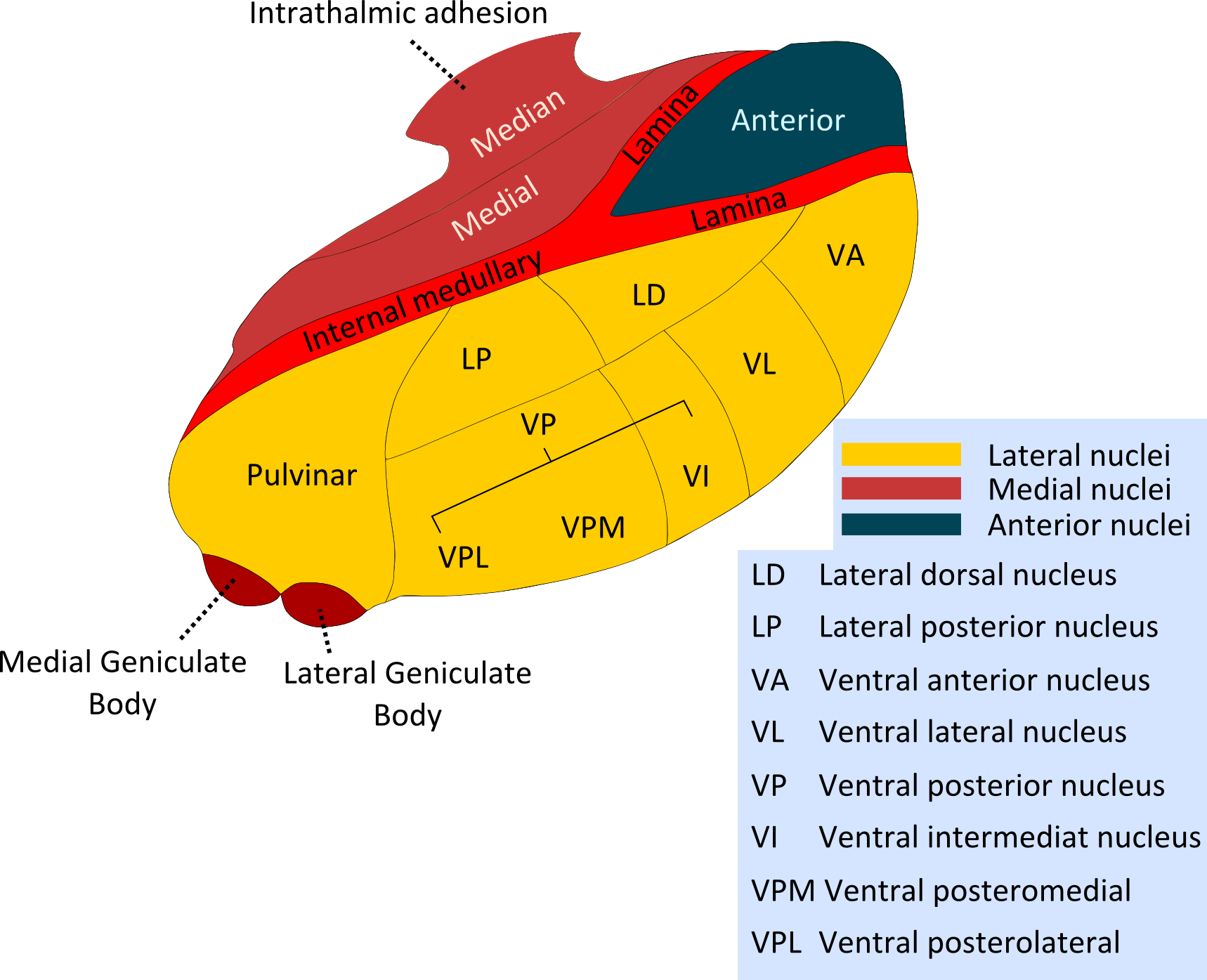
- Thalamic nuclei

Identifiers
- MeSH: D020651
- NeuroNames: 333
- NeuroLex ID: birnlex_1669

The ventral nuclear group is a collection of nuclei on the ventral side of the thalamus, it consists of the following:

- ventral anterior nucleus
- ventral lateral nucleus
- ventral posterior nucleus – this is made up of two nuclei: the ventral posterolateral nucleus and the ventral posteromedial nucleus

== See also ==
- Anterolateral region of the motor thalamus
