= Pulvinar nuclei =

Nuclei located in the thalamus

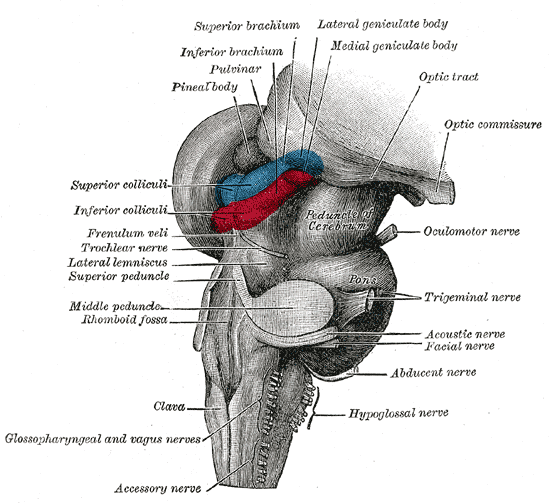
- Hind- and mid-brains; postero-lateral view. (Pulvinar visible near top.)

- Thalamic nuclei: MNG = Midline nuclear group AN = Anterior nuclear group MD = Medial dorsal nucleus VNG = Ventral nuclear group VA = Ventral anterior nucleus VL = Ventral lateral nucleus VPL = Ventral posterolateral nucleus VPM = Ventral posteromedial nucleus LNG = Lateral nuclear group PUL = Pulvinar; MTh = Metathalamus; LG = Lateral geniculate nucleus MG = Medial geniculate nucleus

Details
- Part of: Thalamus

Identifiers
- Latin: nuclei pulvinares (the nuclei plurally); pulvinar thalami (the set of nuclei singularly)
- MeSH: D020649
- NeuroNames: 328
- NeuroLex ID: birnlex_824
- TA98: A14.1.08.104; A14.1.08.610
- TA2: 5665, 5698
- FMA: 62178

The pulvinar nuclei or nuclei of the pulvinar (nuclei pulvinares) are the nuclei (cell bodies of neurons) located in the thalamus (a part of the vertebrate brain). As a group they make up the collection called the pulvinar of the thalamus (pulvinar thalami), usually just called the pulvinar.

The pulvinar is usually grouped as one of the lateral thalamic nuclei in rodents and carnivores, and stands as an independent complex in primates.

Pulvinar acts as an association nucleus that, along with medial dorsal nucleus, connected with parietal, occipital, and temporal lobes, but the function is largely unknown. No distinctive syndrome or obvious sensory deficit can be linked to either one.

== Structure ==
By convention, the pulvinar is divided into four nuclei:

TA alphanumeric identifier	TA name	English translation
A14.1.08.611	nucleus pulvinaris anterior	anterior pulvinar nucleus
A14.1.08.612	nucleus pulvinaris inferior	inferior pulvinar nucleus
A14.1.08.613	nucleus pulvinaris lateralis	lateral pulvinar nucleus
A14.1.08.614	nucleus pulvinaris medialis	medial pulvinar nucleus

Their connectomic details are as follows:

- The lateral and inferior pulvinar nuclei have widespread connections with early visual cortical areas.
- The dorsal part of the lateral pulvinar nucleus predominantly has connections with posterior parietal cortex and the dorsal stream cortical areas.
- The medial pulvinar nucleus has widespread connections with cingulate, posterior parietal, premotor and prefrontal cortical areas.
- The pulvinar also has input from the superior colliculus to inferior, lateral and medial sections, which seems to be important in the initiation and compensation of saccade, as well as the regulation of visual attention

== Clinical significance ==
No distinctive syndrome or obvious sensory deficit can be linked to the pulvinar. Lesions of the pulvinar can result in neglect syndromes and attentional deficits. In addition, lesions in early life can impact normal visuomotor behaviors such as reaching and grasping. Furthermore, the pulvinar was demonstrated to be instrumental in the preservation of vision afforded to a boy who lost his primary visual cortex bilaterally at birth as well as other forms of blindsight in monkeys and humans. Strokes affecting the pulvinar have also been implicated in the development of chronic pain. In a case study of photophobia caused by blue light, pulvinar nuclei associated with the melanopsin containing ipRGCs visual pathway where bilaterally activated.

== Other animals ==
The pulvinar varies in importance in different animals: it is virtually nonexistent in the rat, and grouped as the lateral posterior-pulvinar complex with the lateral posterior thalamic nucleus due to its small size in cats. In humans it makes up roughly 40% of the thalamus making it the largest of its nuclei. Significant research has been undertaken in the marmoset examining the role of the retinorecipient region of the inferior pulvinar (medial subdivision), which projects to visual cortical area MT, in the early development of MT and the dorsal stream, as well as following early-life lesions of the primary visual cortex (V1).

== Etymology ==
The word pulvinar (/pʌlˈvaɪnər/) in Latin broadly means an armchair lined with numerous pillows. It was first neuroanatomically named by Karl Friedrich Burdach in 1817: "The cushion (pulvinar), a swelling at the posterior end of the inner edge of the upper quadrigemina like a pillow over seats", English translation (original German: "Das Polster (pulvinar), eine Anschwellung am hintern Ende des inner Randes der obern Vierhügel wie ein Kissen herüber legt"). In Latin pulvinus could refer to "a sofa, cushioned seat, seat of honor, easy couch; of the couch or marriage-bed ", or more specifically, "a couch made of cushions, and spread over with a splendid covering, for the gods and persons who received divine honors; a couch or cushioned seat of the gods". In the religion of ancient Rome, a pulvinar was an hetoimasia or empty throne, cushioned for occupation by a deity. This allusion to a "seat" may refer to the pineal gland, which the French philosopher René Descartes had identified as the seat of the intellect and soul.

== Additional images ==
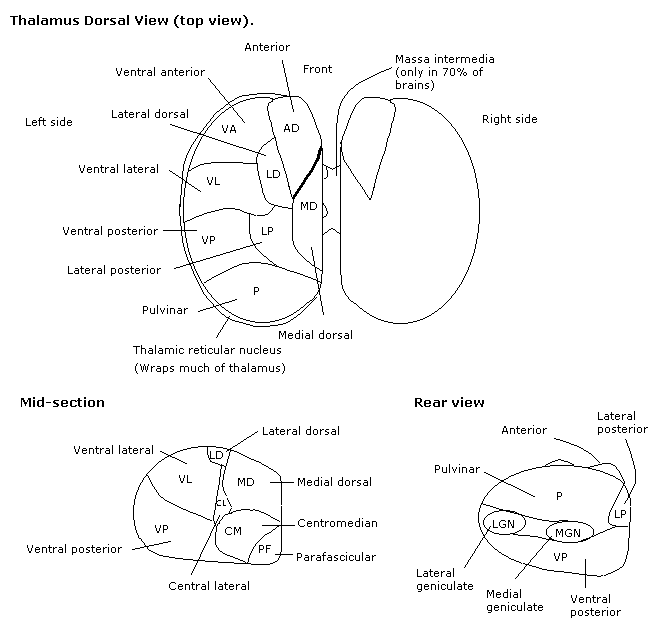
Thalamus

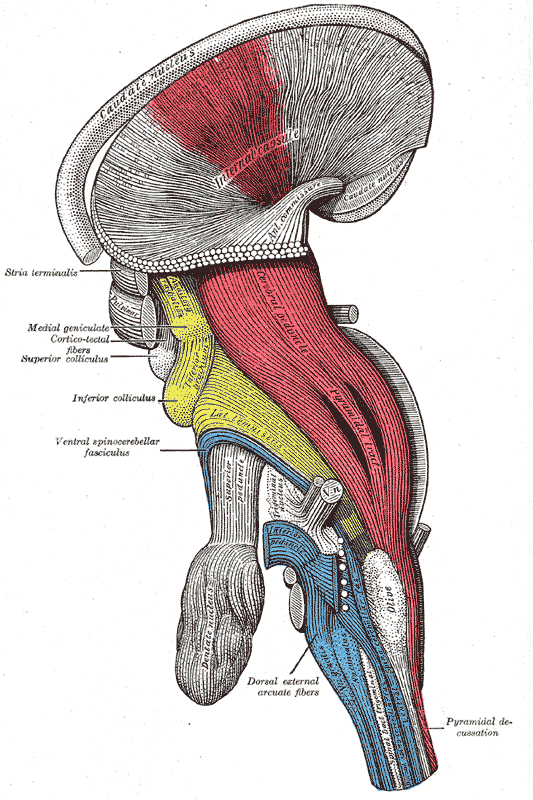
Deep dissection of brain-stem. Lateral view.

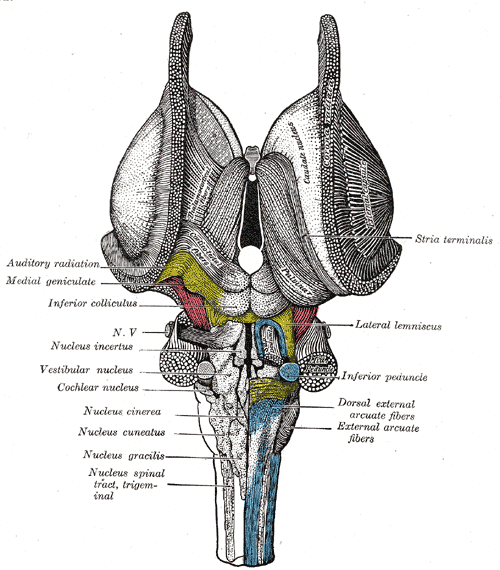
Dissection of brain-stem. Dorsal view.

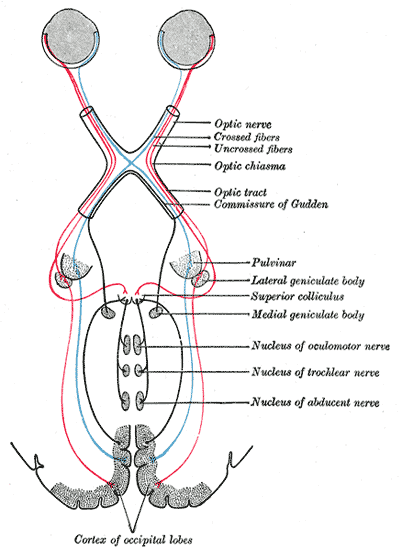
Scheme showing central connections of the optic nerves and optic tracts.

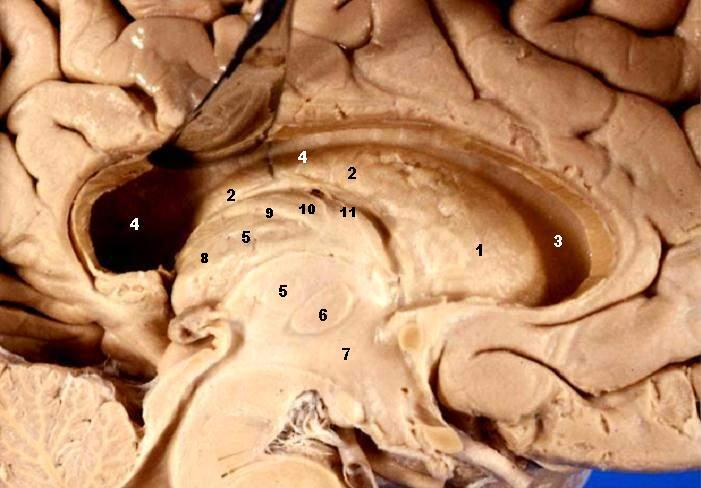
Human brain left dissected midsagittal view
