= Midline nuclear group =

Region of the thalamus in the vertebrate brain

- Thalamic nuclei: MNG = Midline nuclear group AN = Anterior nuclear group MD = Medial dorsal nucleus VNG = Ventral nuclear group VA = Ventral anterior nucleus VL = Ventral lateral nucleus VPL = Ventral posterolateral nucleus VPM = Ventral posteromedial nucleus LNG = Lateral nuclear group PUL = Pulvinar; MTh = Metathalamus; LG = Lateral geniculate nucleus MG = Medial geniculate nucleus

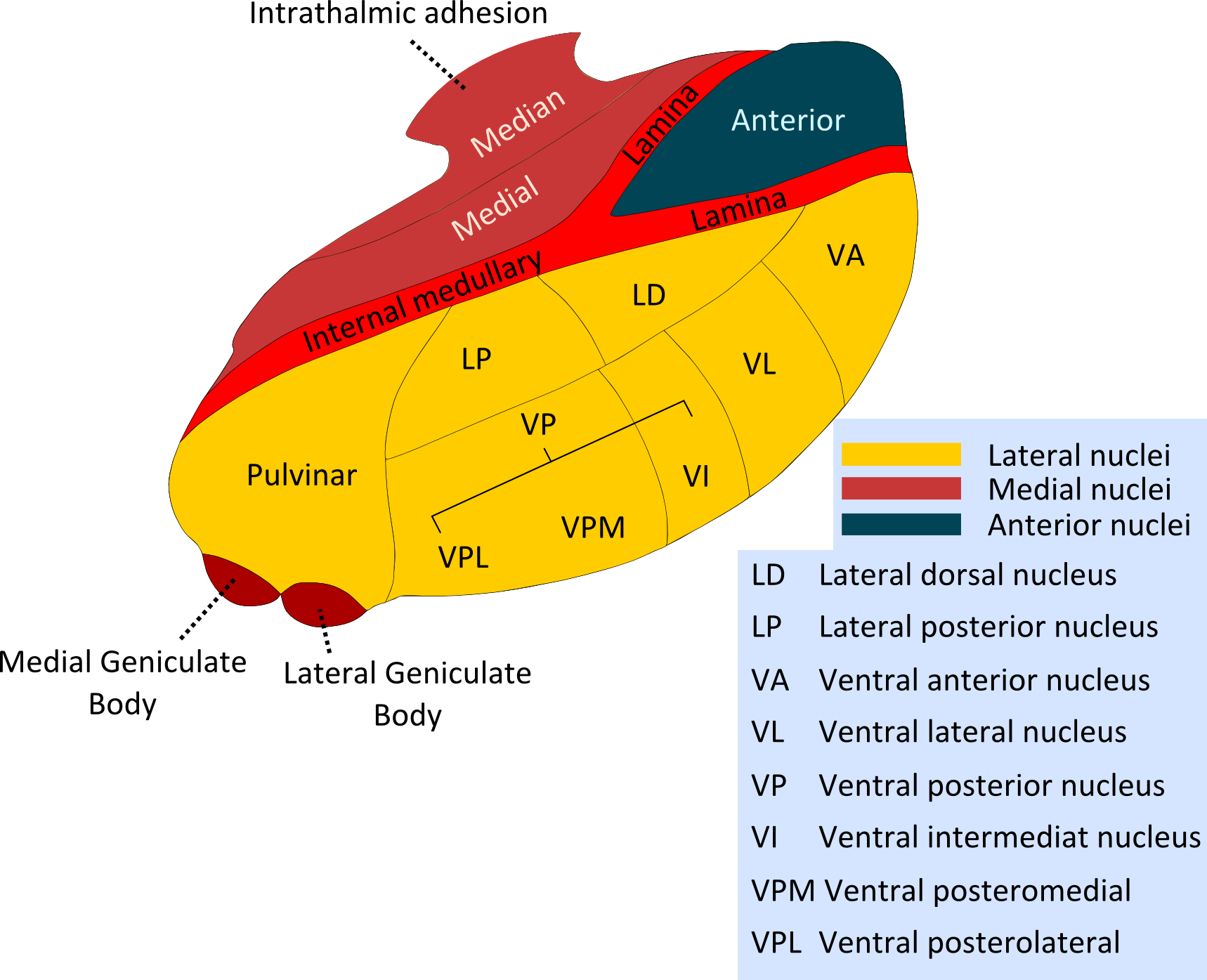
- Thalamic nuclei

Details

Identifiers
- Latin: nuclei mediani thalami
- MeSH: D020644
- NeuroNames: 306
- NeuroLex ID: birnlex_1462
- TA98: A14.1.08.627

The midline nuclear group (or midline thalamic nuclei) is a region of the thalamus consisting of the following nuclei:

- paraventricular nucleus of thalamus (nucleus paraventricularis thalami) - not to be confused with paraventricular nucleus of hypothalamus
- paratenial nucleus (nucleus parataenialis)
- nucleus reuniens (also known as the medioventral nucleus)
- rhomboidal nucleus (nucleus commissuralis rhomboidalis)
- subfascicular nucleus (nucleus subfascicularis)

The midline nuclei are often called "nonspecific" in that they project widely to the cortex and elsewhere. This has led to the assumption that they may be involved in general functions such as alerting. However, anatomical connections might suggest more specific functions, with the paraventricular and paratenial nuclei involved in viscero-limbic functions, and the reuniens and rhomboid nuclei involved in multimodal sensory processing.
