= Ventral posteromedial nucleus =

Nucleus of the thalamus

- Thalamic nuclei: MNG = Midline nuclear group AN = Anterior nuclear group MD = Medial dorsal nucleus VNG = Ventral nuclear group VA = Ventral anterior nucleus VL = Ventral lateral nucleus VPL = Ventral posterolateral nucleus VPM = Ventral posteromedial nucleus LNG = Lateral nuclear group PUL = Pulvinar; MTh = Metathalamus; LG = Lateral geniculate nucleus MG = Medial geniculate nucleus

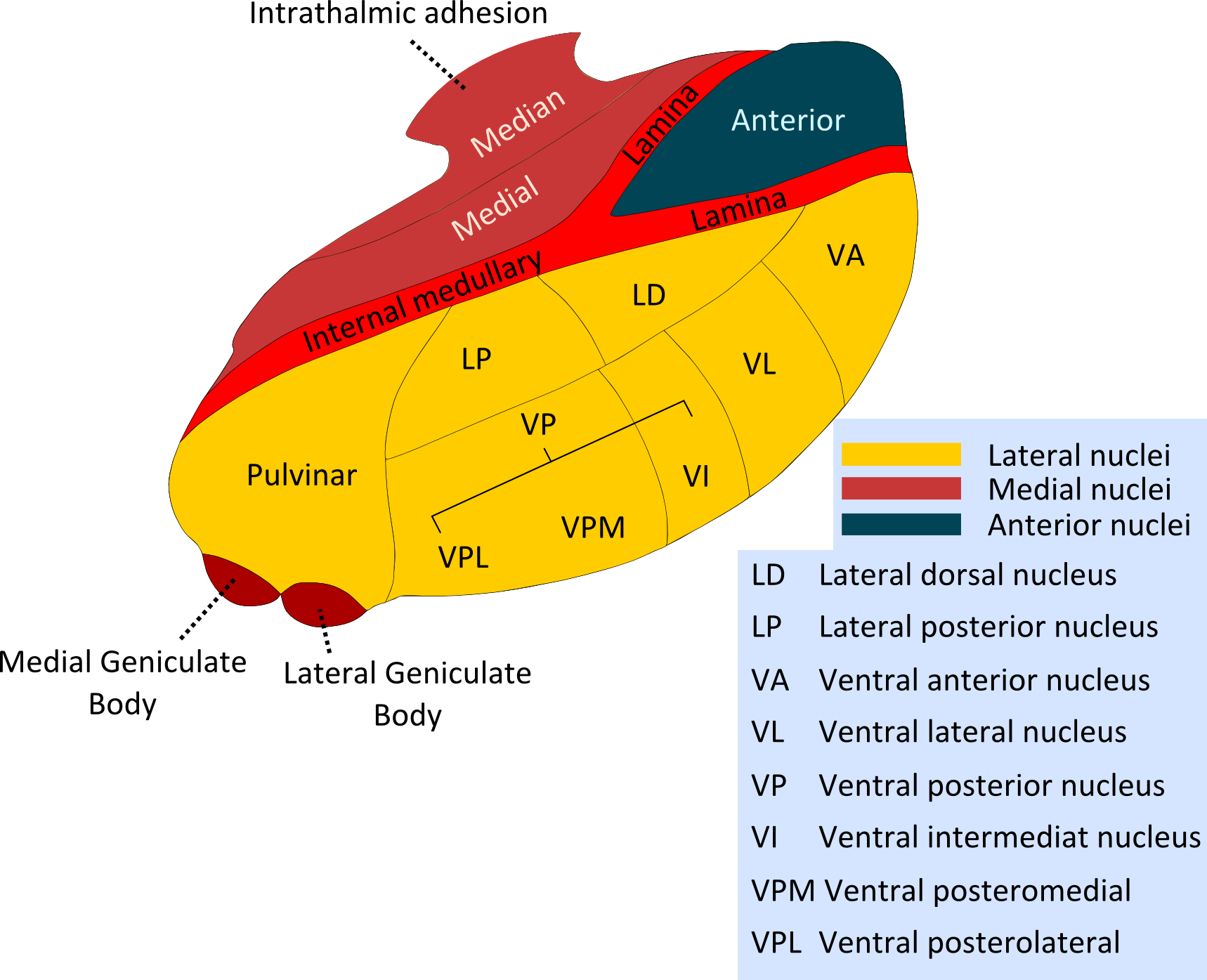
- Thalamic nuclei

Details

Identifiers
- Latin: nucleus ventralis posteromedialis
- NeuroNames: 347
- NeuroLex ID: birnlex_743
- TA98: A14.1.08.642
- TA2: 5693
- FMA: 62202

The ventral posteromedial nucleus (VPM) is a nucleus within the ventral posterior nucleus of the thalamus and serves an analogous somatosensory relay role for the ascending trigeminothalamic tracts as its lateral neighbour the ventral posterolateral nucleus serves for dorsal column–medial lemniscus pathway 2nd-order neurons.

The term "ventral posteromedial nucleus" was introduced by Le Gros Clark in 1930.

== Afferents and efferents ==
=== Orofacial somatosensory ===
The VPM receives second-order general somatic afferent fibers from the ventral trigeminal tract and the dorsal trigeminal tract which convey general somatic sensory information from the face and oral cavity (including touch, pressure, temperature, pain, and propriception). Proprioceptive synapses are situated anteriorly, ones mediating touch in the middle, and nociceptive ones posteriorly.

Third-order neurons in turn project to the somatosensory cortex in the postcentral gyrus.

=== Taste ===
The VPM receives second-order taste special visceral afferents from the solitary nucleus. These synapse in the medial-most portion of the VPM, which is sometimes referred to as the accessory arcuate nucleus.

Third-order neurons in turn project to the gustatory cortex.

=== Visceral sensations ===
The VPM likely also receives some general visceral afferents from the solitary tract conveying non-nociceptive visceral conscious sensations.

== Subareas ==
=== VPMpc ===
The VPMpc is the parvicellular part of the ventral posteromedial nucleus. The VPMpc receives ipsilateral projection inputs from the medial parabrachial nucleus, the "gustatory responsive waist region" of the parabrachial nucleus (which has inputs from the solitary nucleus). The axons of these VPMpc relay neurons make synapses with neurons in all layers of the gustatory cortex.

The VPMpc is argued by some as not actually a part of the VPM, because it does not project to the somatosensory cortex as the remainder of the VPM does, and therefore should be called the basal ventromedial (or ventral medial) nucleus (VMb) instead. However, later authors have retained the VPMpc abbreviation, meaning the parvicellular part of the VPM.

== See also ==
- Ventral posterolateral nucleus — relays somatosensory afferents from the rest of the body (dorsal column–medial lemniscus pathway, and spinothalamic tract).
- Ventrobasal complex
- List of thalamic nuclei

== Additional images ==
Thalamus
