= Ventral lateral nucleus =

Component of the thalamus in the central nervous system

- Thalamic nuclei: MNG = Midline nuclear group AN = Anterior nuclear group MD = Medial dorsal nucleus VNG = Ventral nuclear group VA = Ventral anterior nucleus VL = Ventral lateral nucleus VPL = Ventral posterolateral nucleus VPM = Ventral posteromedial nucleus LNG = Lateral nuclear group PUL = Pulvinar; MTh = Metathalamus; LG = Lateral geniculate nucleus MG = Medial geniculate nucleus

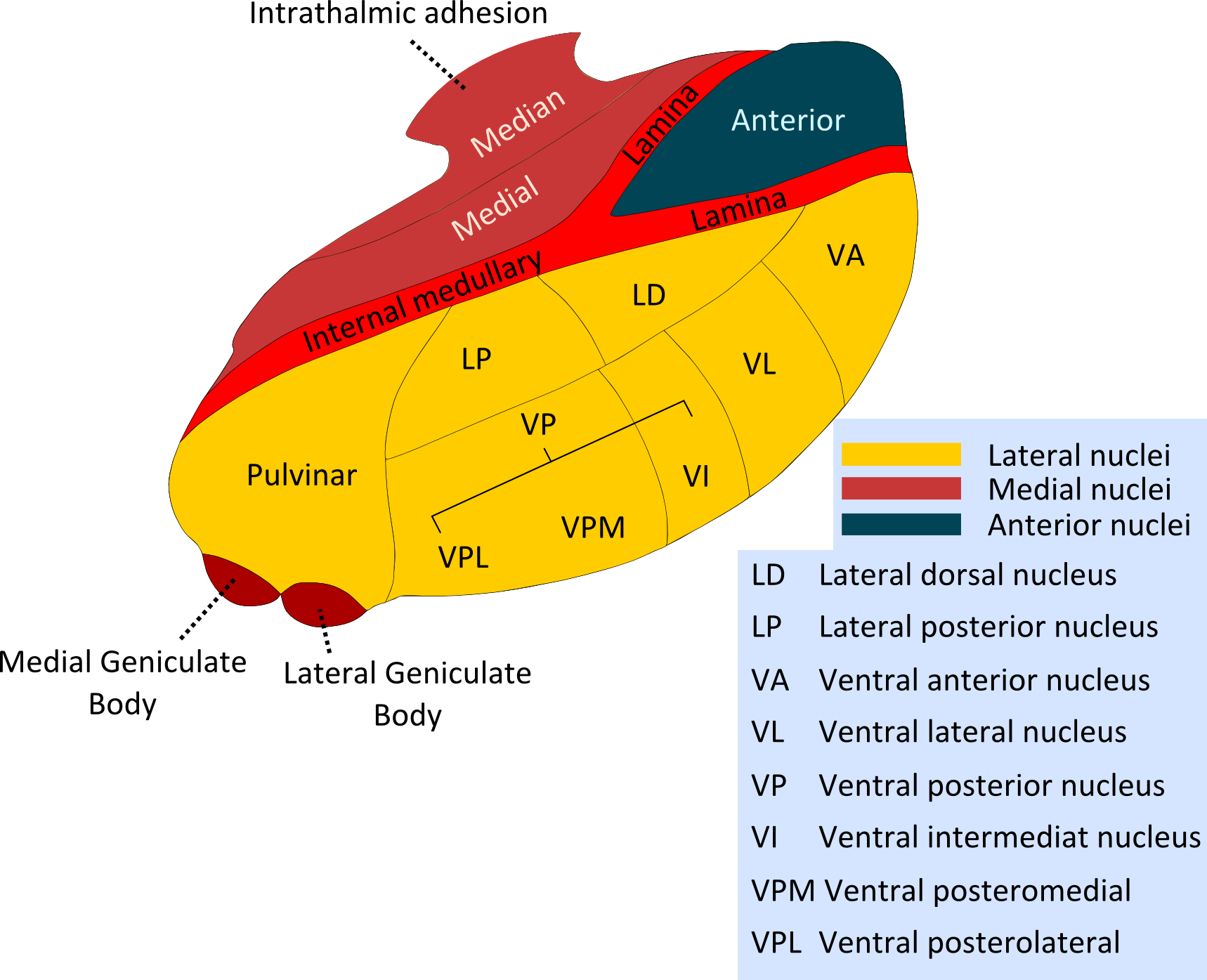
- Thalamic nuclei

Identifiers
- NeuroNames: 337
- NeuroLex ID: birnlex_1237

The ventral lateral nucleus (VL) is a nucleus in the ventral nuclear group of the thalamus.

== Inputs and outputs ==
It receives neuronal inputs from the basal ganglia which includes the substantia nigra and the globus pallidus (via the thalamic fasciculus). It also has inputs from the cerebellum (via the dentatothalamic tract).

It sends neuronal output to the primary motor cortex and premotor cortex.

The ventral lateral nucleus in the thalamus forms the motor functional division in the thalamic nuclei along with the ventral anterior nucleus. The ventral lateral nucleus receives motor information from the cerebellum and the globus pallidus. Output from the ventral lateral nucleus then goes to the primary motor cortex and premotor cortex.

== Functions ==
The function of the ventral lateral nucleus is to target efferents including the motor cortex, premotor cortex, and supplementary motor cortex. Therefore, its function helps the coordination and planning of movement. It also plays a role in the learning of movement.

== Clinical significance ==
A lesion of the VL has been associated with synesthesia.

== Subdivisions ==
The subdivisions of the ventral lateral nucleus include the following nuclei.

- ventral medial nucleus (a.k.a. medial part of ventral lateral nucleus)
- anterior ventral lateral nucleus (pallidal inputs, projects mainly to premotor cortex)
- posterior ventral lateral nucleus (cerebellar inputs, principal relay to motor cortex)

== Additional images ==
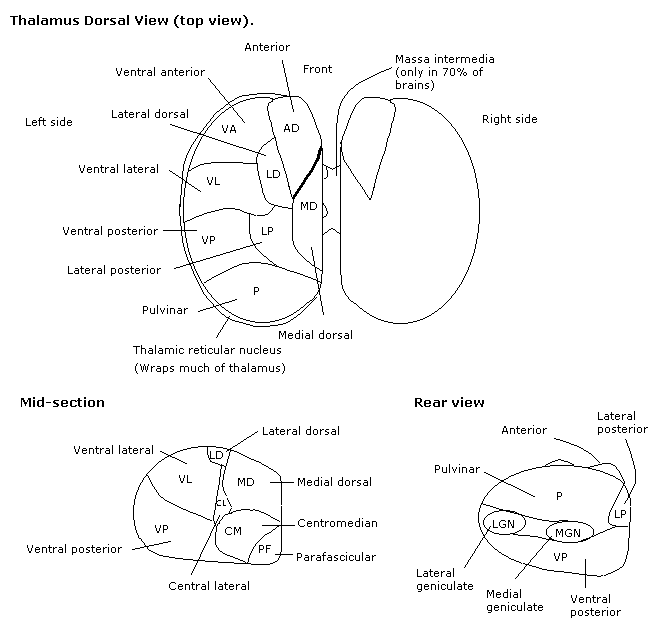
Thalamus

Thalamus
