= Ventral anterior nucleus =

Nucleus in the ventral nuclear group of the thalamus

- Thalamic nuclei: MNG = Midline nuclear group AN = Anterior nuclear group MD = Medial dorsal nucleus VNG = Ventral nuclear group VA = Ventral anterior nucleus VL = Ventral lateral nucleus VPL = Ventral posterolateral nucleus VPM = Ventral posteromedial nucleus LNG = Lateral nuclear group PUL = Pulvinar; MTh = Metathalamus; LG = Lateral geniculate nucleus MG = Medial geniculate nucleus

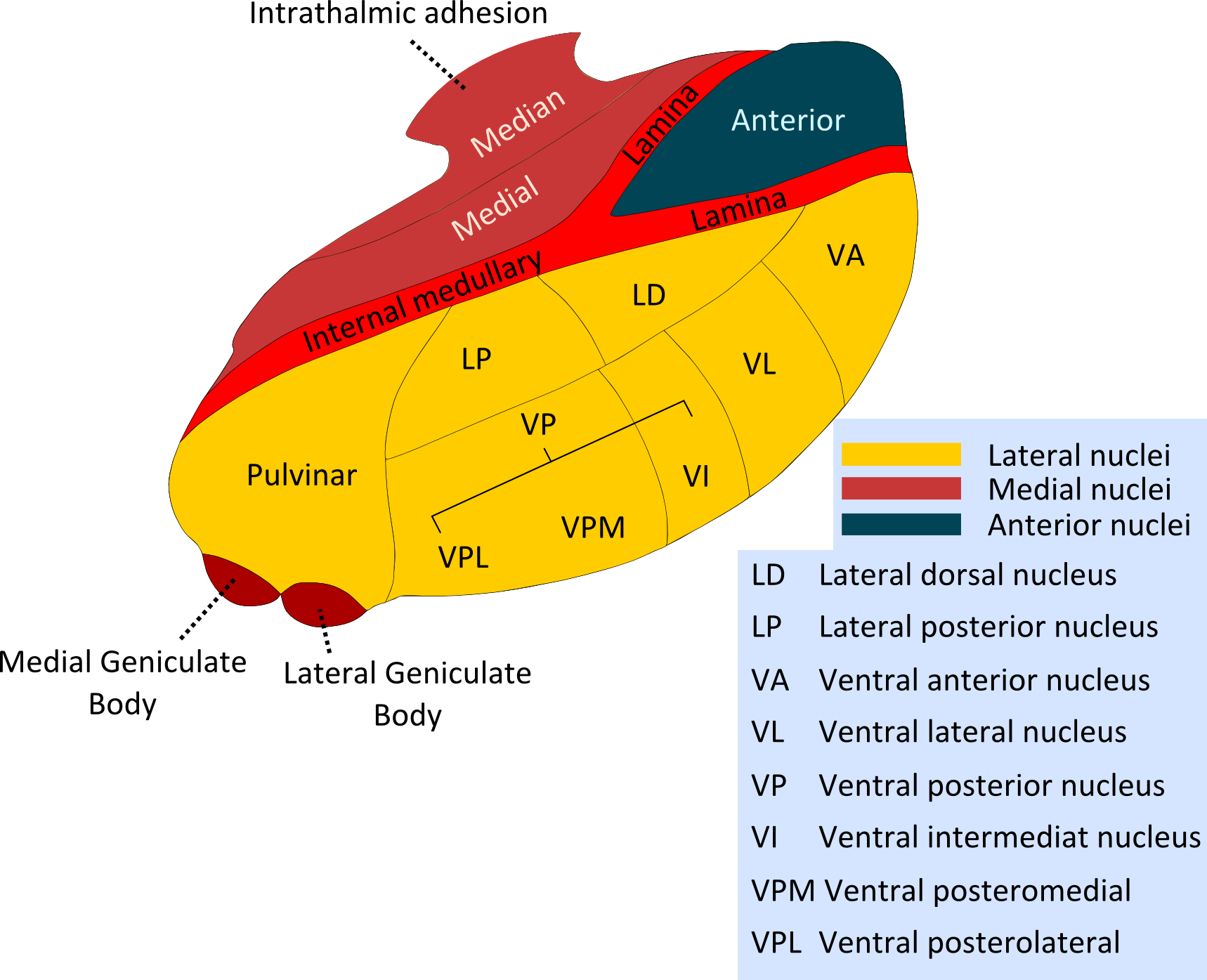
- Thalamic nuclei

Details

Identifiers
- Latin: nucleus ventralis anterior thalami
- NeuroNames: 334
- NeuroLex ID: birnlex_1232
- TA98: A14.1.08.652
- TA2: 5688
- FMA: 62184

The ventral anterior nucleus (VA) is a nucleus in the ventral nuclear group of the thalamus. It acts with the anterior part of the ventral lateral nucleus to modify signals from the basal ganglia.

== Inputs and outputs ==
The ventral anterior nucleus receives neuronal inputs from the basal ganglia. Its main afferent fibres are from the globus pallidus. The efferent fibres from this nucleus pass into the premotor cortex for initiation and planning of movement.

== Functions ==
It helps to function in movement by providing feedback for the outputs of the basal ganglia.

== Additional images ==
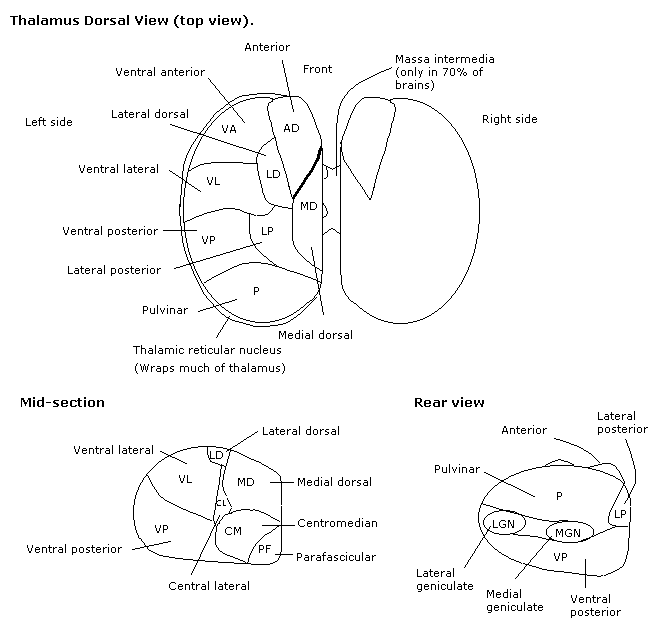
Thalamus

Thalamus
