= Ventral posterolateral nucleus =

Nucleus

- Thalamic nuclei: MNG = Midline nuclear group AN = Anterior nuclear group MD = Medial dorsal nucleus VNG = Ventral nuclear group VA = Ventral anterior nucleus VL = Ventral lateral nucleus VPL = Ventral posterolateral nucleus VPM = Ventral posteromedial nucleus LNG = Lateral nuclear group PUL = Pulvinar; MTh = Metathalamus; LG = Lateral geniculate nucleus MG = Medial geniculate nucleus

- Thalamic nuclei

Details
- Part of: Ventral posterior nucleus

Identifiers
- Latin: nucleus ventralis posterolateralis
- NeuroNames: 344
- NeuroLex ID: birnlex_737
- TA98: A14.1.08.641; A14.1.08.656
- TA2: 5692
- FMA: 62200

The ventral posterolateral nucleus (VPL) is one of the subdivisions of the ventral posterior nucleus in the ventral nuclear group of the thalamus. It relays sensory information from second-order neurons of the neospinothalamic tract and the medial lemniscus (of the dorsal column-medial lemniscus pathway), which synapse with third-order neurons in the nucleus. These then project to the primary somatosensory cortex in the postcentral gyrus.

There is uncertainty regarding the location of VMpo (posterior part of ventral medial nucleus), as determined by spinothalamic tract (STT) terminations and calcium-binding protein staining, and several authorities do not consider its existence as being proved.

The term "ventral posterolateral nucleus" was introduced by Le Gros Clark in 1930.

== Anatomy ==
=== Subdivisions ===
The oral part of the ventral posterolateral nucleus (nucleus ventrointermedius) in the human, (VPLO) is a subdivision of the VPL with projections to the motor cortex.

There is also a caudal part of the ventral posterolateral nucleus (VPLC).

== Additional images ==
Thalamus

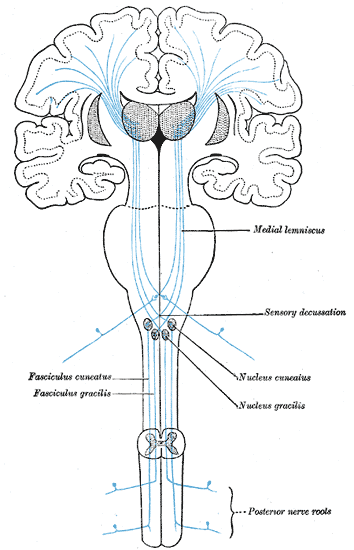
The sensory tract.
