= Anterior nuclei of thalamus =

Collection of neurons

- Thalamic nuclei: MNG = Midline nuclear group AN = Anterior nuclear group MD = Medial dorsal nucleus VNG = Ventral nuclear group VA = Ventral anterior nucleus VL = Ventral lateral nucleus VPL = Ventral posterolateral nucleus VPM = Ventral posteromedial nucleus LNG = Lateral nuclear group PUL = Pulvinar; MTh = Metathalamus; LG = Lateral geniculate nucleus MG = Medial geniculate nucleus

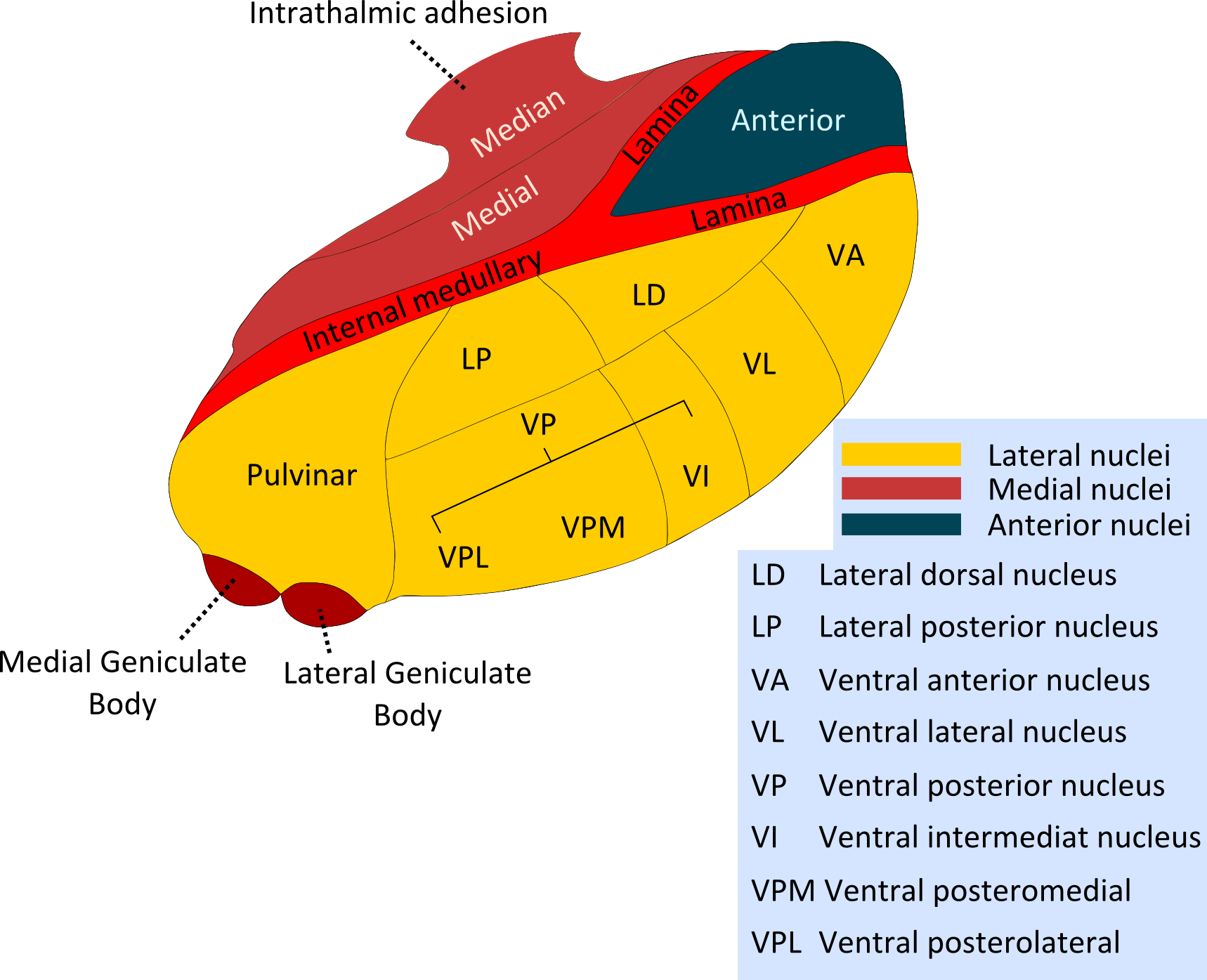
- Thalamic nuclei

Details
- Part of: Thalamus

Identifiers
- Latin: nuclei anteriores thalami
- NeuroNames: 302
- NeuroLex ID: birnlex_1692
- TA98: A14.1.08.603
- TA2: 5679
- FMA: 62019

The anterior nuclei of thalamus (or anterior nuclear group) are a collection of nuclei at the rostral end of the dorsal thalamus. They comprise the anteromedial, anterodorsal, and anteroventral nuclei.

== Inputs and outputs ==
The anterior nuclei receive afferents from the hippocampus and subiculum directly via the fornix, and indirectly via the mammillary bodies and mammillothalamic tract (MTT). They send efferent fibers to the cingulate gyrus, limbic, and orbitofrontal cortex.

The anterior nuclei of the thalamus display functions pertaining to memory. Persons displaying lesions in the anterior thalamus, preventing input from the pathway involving the hippocampus, mammillary bodies and the MTT, display forms of amnesia, supporting the anterior thalamus's involvement in episodic memory. However, although the hypothalamus projects to both the mammillary bodies and the anterior nuclei of the thalamus, the anterior nuclei receive input from hippocampal cells deep to the pyramidal cells projecting to the mammillary bodies.

These nuclei are considered to be association nuclei, one of the three broader subdivisions of thalamic nuclei. These nuclei receive input from the cerebral cortex. The input received is integrated and re-directed back to the cortical areas of the cerebrum known as association areas. The anterior nuclei regulate the input which is redistributed to the cortex. The connections of the anterior nuclei are similar to those of the lateral dorsal (LD) nuclei.

== Function ==
These nuclei are thought to play a role in the modulation of alertness and are involved in learning and episodic memory. They are considered to be part of the limbic system.

The anterior thalamic nuclei (ATN) are recently thought to be connected in pathways serving a spatial navigation role in reference to propagating head movements. The ATN displays bidirectional connections with the postsubiculum, a hippocampal structure in humans involved in regulating signaling relative to the movement of the head in the horizontal plane. This structure contains "head direction cells" hypothesized to also be present in the ATN. These head direction cells fire in response to an animal pointing its head in a certain direction. Ultimately, the firing sequences of these cells encode information allowing an animal to perceive its direction in relation to its spatial environment.

== Additional images ==
Thalamus
