= Medial dorsal nucleus =

Large nucleus in the thalamus

- Thalamic nuclei: (left thalamus from left); MNG = Midline nuclear group AN = Anterior nuclear group MD = Medial dorsal nucleus VNG = Ventral nuclear group VA = Ventral anterior nucleus VL = Ventral lateral nucleus VPL = Ventral posterolateral nucleus VPM = Ventral posteromedial nucleus LNG = Lateral nuclear group PUL = Pulvinar; MTh = Metathalamus; LG = Lateral geniculate nucleus MG = Medial geniculate nucleus

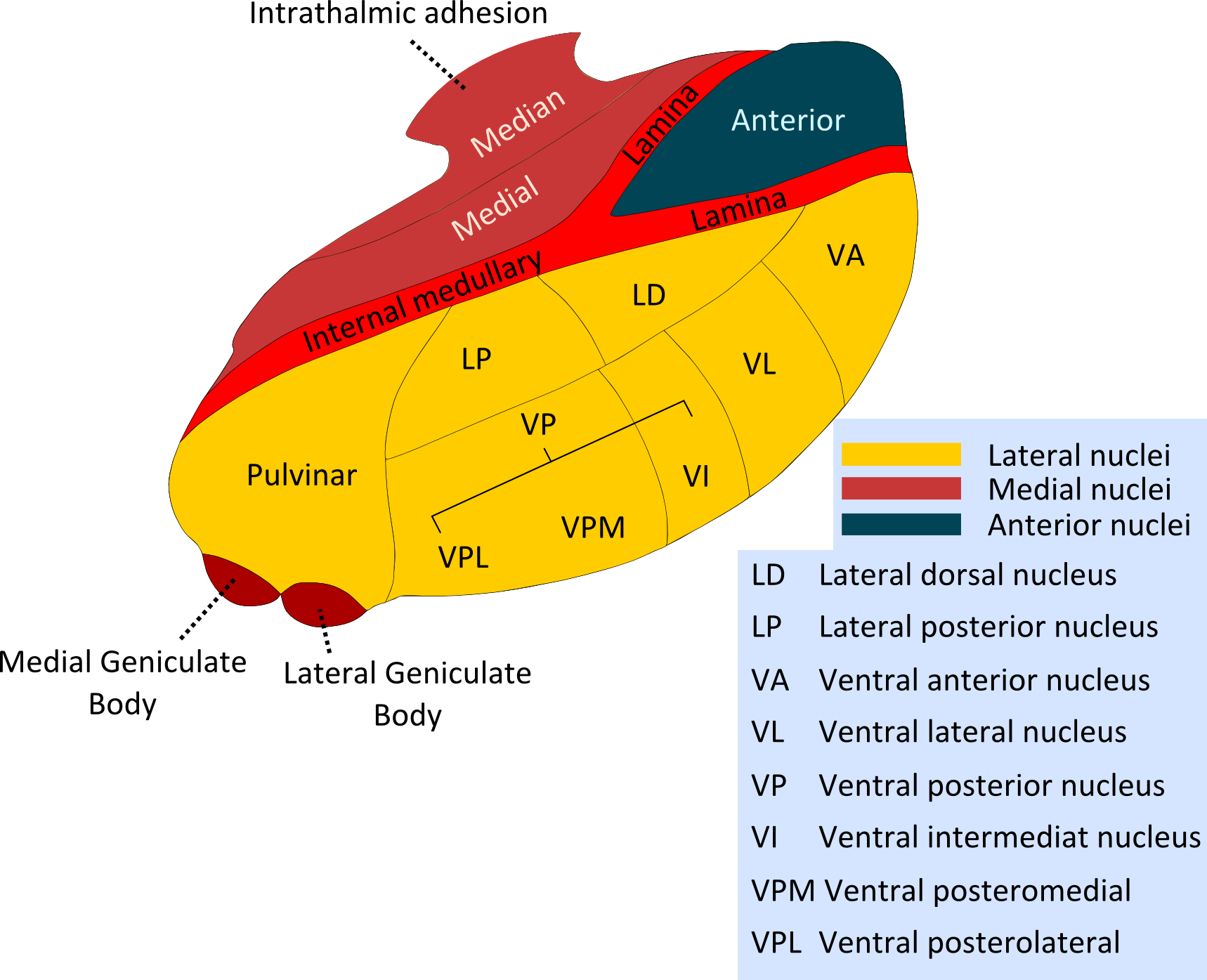
- right thalamus nuclei (above right view)

Details

Identifiers
- Latin: nucleus mediodorsalis thalami
- MeSH: D020645
- NeuroNames: 312
- NeuroLex ID: birnlex_1543
- TA98: A14.1.08.622
- TA2: 5681
- FMA: 62156

The medial dorsal nucleus (or mediodorsal nucleus of thalamus, dorsomedial nucleus, dorsal medial nucleus, or medial nucleus group) is a large nucleus in the thalamus. It is separated from the other thalamic nuclei by the internal medullary lamina.

The medial dorsal nucleus is interconnected with the prefrontal cortex, therefore involved in prefrontal functions. Damage to the interconnected tract or the nucleus itself will result in similar damage to the prefrontal cortex. It is also believed to play a role in memory.

== Structure ==
The medial dorsal nucleus relays inputs from the amygdala and olfactory cortex and projects to the prefrontal cortex and the limbic system, and in turn relays them to the prefrontal association cortex. As a result, it plays a crucial role in attention, planning, organization, abstract thinking, multi-tasking, and active memory.

The connections of the medial dorsal nucleus have even been used to delineate the prefrontal cortex of the Göttingen minipig brain.

By stereology the number of brain cells in the region has been estimated at around 6.43 million neurons in the adult human brain and 36.3 million glial cells, with the newborn having quite different numbers: around 11.2 million neurons and 10.6 million glial cells.

=== Parts of nucleus ===
The medial dorsal nucleus has four parts.

1. paralaminar part of the medial dorsal nucleus
2. magnocellular part of the medial dorsal nucleus
3. parvicellular/parvocellular part of the medial dorsal nucleus
4. densocellular part of the medial dorsal nucleus

== Function ==
=== Pain processing ===
While both the ventral and medial dorsal nuclei process pain, the medial dorsal nucleus bypasses primary cortices, sending their axons directly to secondary and association cortices. The cells also send axons directly to many parts of the brain, including nuclei of the limbic system such as the lateral nucleus of the amygdala, the anterior cingulate, and the hippocampus. This part of the sensory system, known as the non-classical or extralemniscal system is less accurate, and less detailed in regards to sensory signal analysis. This processing is known colloquially as "fast and dirty" rather than the "slow and accurate" processing of the classical or lemniscal system. This pathway activates parts of the brain that evoke emotional responses.

=== Saccadic efference copy ===
The medial dorsal nucleus is also presumed to play a role in monitoring internal movements of the eye. Specifically, its function is to relay the information about how the eyes will be moved (efference copy, also known as corollary discharge) from the superior colliculus to the frontal eye fields (FEF) in order to aid the neurons in FEF to change their receptive fields to where the visual stimuli will appear after the saccade.

== Clinical significance ==
Damage to the medial dorsal nucleus has been associated with Korsakoff's syndrome.

== Additional images ==
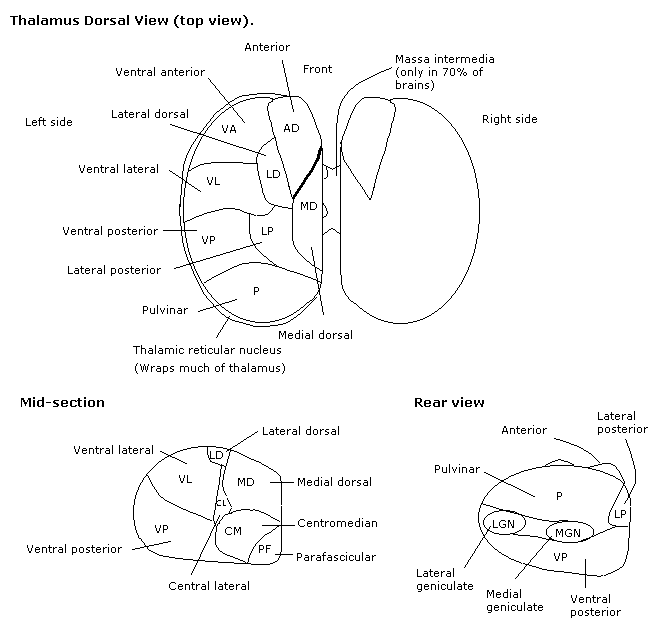
Thalamus

Thalamus

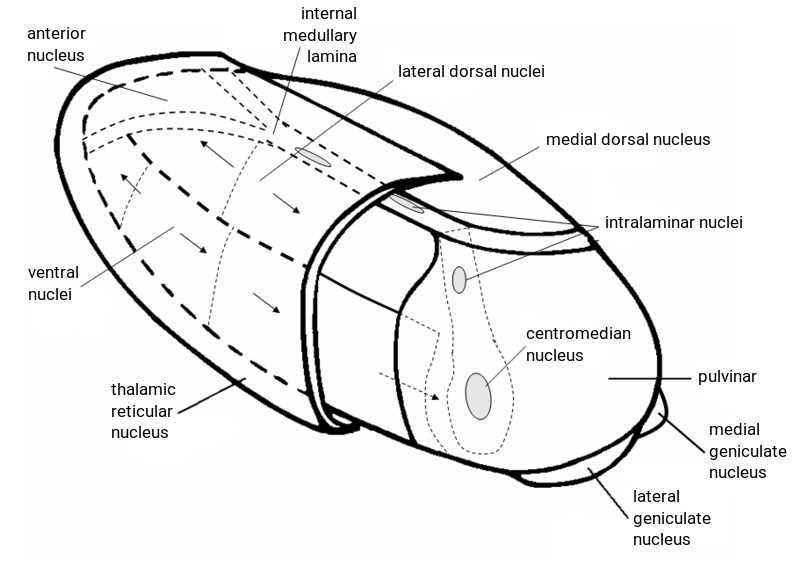
Human left thalamus (left upper rear view)
