= Primate basal ganglia =

Part of the nervous system in primates

Diagram of the main components of the basal ganglia and their interconnections. GPe = External globus pallidus GPi = Internal globus pallidus STN = Subthalamic nucleus SNpr = Pars reticulata SNpc = Pars compacta Glutamatergic pathways are red, dopaminergic pathways are magenta and GABAergic pathways are blue.

The basal ganglia form a major brain system in all vertebrates, but in primates (including humans) there are special differentiating features. The basal ganglia include the striatum, globus pallidus, substantia nigra and subthalamic nucleus. In primates the pallidus is divided into an external and internal globus pallidus, the external globus pallidus is present in other mammals but not the internal globus pallidus. Also in primates, the dorsal striatum is divided by a large nerve tract called the internal capsule into two masses named the caudate nucleus and the putamen. These differences contribute to a complex circuitry of connections between the striatum and cortex that is specific to primates, reflecting different functions in primate cortical areas.

== Corticostriatal connection ==
A major output from the cortex, with axons from most of the cortical regions connecting to the striatum, is called the corticostriatal connection, part of the cortico-basal ganglia-thalamo-cortical loop, or basal ganglia loop in short. In the primate most of these axons are thin and unbranched. The striatum does not receive axons from the primary olfactory, visual or auditory cortices. The corticostriatal connection is an excitatory glutamatergic pathway. One small cortical site can project many axon branches to several parts of the striatum.

== Striatum ==
The striatum is the largest structure of the basal ganglia.

=== Structure ===
==== Neuronal constitution ====
Medium spiny neurons (MSN)s, account for up to 95 per cent of the striatal neurons. There are two populations of these projection neurons, MSN1 and MSN2, both of which are inhibitory GABAergic. There are also various groups of GABAergic interneurons and a single group of cholinergic interneurons. These few types are responsible for the reception, processing, and relaying of all the cortical input.

Most of the dendritic spines on the medium spiny neurons synapse with cortical afferents and their axons project numerous collaterals to other neurons. The cholinergic interneurons of the primate, are very different from those of non-primates. These are said to be tonically active.

The dorsal striatum and the ventral striatum have different populations of the cholinergic interneurons showing a marked difference in shape.

==== Physiology ====
Unless stimulated by cortical input the striatal neurons are usually inactive.

==== Levels of organisation ====
The striatum is one mass of grey matter that has two different parts, a ventral and a dorsal part. The dorsal striatum contains the caudate nucleus and the putamen, and the ventral striatum contains the nucleus accumbens and the olfactory tubercle. The internal capsule is seen as dividing the two parts of the dorsal striatum. Sensorimotor input is mostly to the putamen. An associative input goes to the caudate nucleus and possibly to the nucleus accumbens.

There are two different components of the striatum differentiated by staining – striosomes and a matrix. Striosomes are located in the matrix of the striatum and these contain μ-opioid receptors and dopamine receptor D1 binding sites.

The striatopallidal fibers give a connection from the putamen to the globus pallidus and substantia nigra.

==== Connectomics ====
Unlike the inhibitory GABAergic neurons in the neocortex that only send local connections, in the striatum these neurons send long axons to targets in the pallidum and substantia nigra. A study in macaques showed that the medium spiny neurons have several targets. Most striatal axons first target the GPe, some of these also target the GPi and both parts of the substantia nigra. There are no single axon projections to either the GPi, or to the SN, or to both of these areas; only connecting as continuing targets via axon collaterals from the striatum to the GPe.

The only difference between the axonal connectomes of the striosomes and the axons of those neurons in the matrix, is in the numbers of their branching axons. Striosomal axons cross the extent of the SN, and in macaques emit 4 to 6 vertical collaterals that form vertical columns which enter deep into the SN pars compacta (SNpc); the axons from those in the matrix are more sparsely branched. This pattern of connectivity is problematic. The main mediator of the striatopallidonigral system is GABA and there are also cotransmitters. The GPe stains for met-enkephalin, the GPi stains for either substance P or dynorphin or both, and the SN stains for both. This probably means that a single axon is able to concentrate different co-mediators in different subtrees, depending on the target.

==== Selectivity of striatal territories for targets ====
A study of the percentage of striatal axons from the sensorimotor (dorsolateral putamen) and associative striatum (caudate nucleus and ventromedial putamen) to the globus pallidus found important differences. The GPe for instance receives a large input of axons from the associative areas. The GPi is strongly sensorimotor connected. The SN is at first associative. This is confirmed by the effects of striatal stimulations.

All the projections from the primary somatosensory cortex to the putamen, avoid the striosomes and innervate areas within the matrix.

== Pallidonigral set and pacemaker ==
=== Constitution ===
The pallidonigral set comprises the direct targets of the striatal axons: the two nuclei of the pallidum, and the pars compacta (SNpc) and pars reticulata (SNpr) of the substantia nigra. One character of this ensemble is given by the very dense striato-pallidonigral bundle giving it its whitish aspect (pallidus means pale). After Foix and Nicolesco (1925) and some others, Cécile and Oskar Vogt (1941) suggested the term pallidum - also used by the Terminologia Anatomica (1998). They also proposed the term nigrum for replacing nigra, which is indeed not a substance; but this is generally not followed. The whole pallidonigral set is made up the same neuronal components. The majority is made up of very large neurons, poorly branched, strongly stained for parvalbumin, having very large dendritic arborisations (much larger in primates than in rodents) with straight and thick dendrites. Only the shape and direction of the dendritic arborizations differ between the pallidum and the SN neurons. The pallidal dendritic arborisations are very large flat and disc-shaped. Their principal plane is parallel to the others and also parallel to the lateral border of the pallidum; thus perpendicular to the axis of the afferences. Since the pallidal discs are thin, they are crossed only for a short distance by striatal axons. However, since they are wide, they are crossed by many striatal axons from wide striatal parts. Since they are loose, the chances of contact are not very high. Striatal arborisations emit perpendicular branches participating in flat bands parallel to the lateral border, which increases the density of synapses in this direction. This is true for not only for the striatal afferent but also for the subthalamic (see below). The synaptology of the set is uncommon and characteristic. The dendrites of the pallidal or nigral axons are entirely covered by synapses, without any apposition of glia. More than 90% of synapses are of striatal origin. One noticeable property of this ensemble is that not one of its elements receives cortical afferents. Initial collaterals are present. However, in addition to the presence of various appendages at the distal extremity of the pallidal neurons that could act as elements of local circuitry, there are weak or no functional interrelations between pallidal neurons.

==== External globus pallidus ====
The external globus pallidus (GPe) or lateral globus pallidus, is flat, curved and extended in depth and width. The branching dendritic trees are disc-shaped, flat, run parallel to each other and to the pallidum border, and are perpendicular to those axons coming from the striatum. The GPe also receives input from the subthalamic nucleus, and dopaminergic input from the SNpc. The GPe does not give output to the thalamus only intrasystemically connecting to the other basal ganglia structures. It can be seen as a GABA inhibitory mediator regulating the basal ganglia. Its firing activity is very fast and exhibits long intervals of up to several seconds of silence.

In monkeys an initial inhibition was seen in response to striatal input, followed by a regulated excitation. In the study this suggested that the excitation was used temporarily to control the magnitude of the incoming signal and to spatially focus this into a limited number of pallidal neurons. GPe neurons are often multi-targeted and may respond to a number of neuron types. In macaques, axons from the GPe to the striatum account for about 15%; those to the GPi, SNpr and subthalamic nucleus are about 84%. The subthalamic nucleus was seen to be the preferred target which also sends most of its axons to the GPe.

==== Internal globus pallidus ====
The internal globus pallidus (GPi) or medial globus pallidus is only found in the primate brain and so is a younger portion of the globus pallidus. Like the GPe and the substantia nigra the GPi is a fast-spiking pacemaker but its activity does not show the long intervals of silence seen in the others. In addition to the striatal input there is also dopaminergic input from the SNpc. Unlike the GPe the GPi does have a thalamic output and a smaller output towards the habenula. It also gives output to other areas including the pedunculopontine nucleus and to the area behind the red nucleus. The evolutionary increase of the internal pallidus also brought an associated increase in the pallidothalamic tracts, and the appearance of the ventral lateral nucleus in the thalamus. The mediator is GABA.

==== Substantia nigra ====
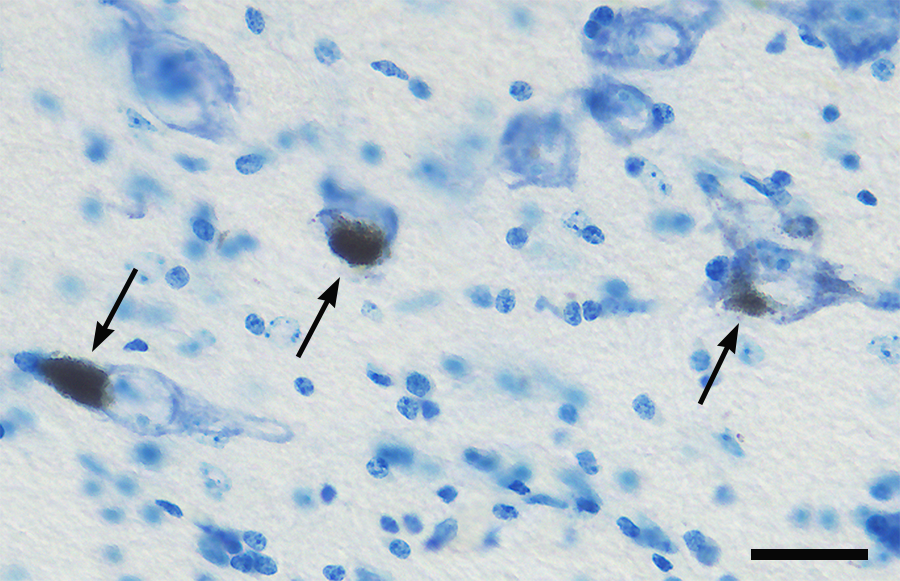
Micrograph of neurons containing neuromelanin (arrows) in the substantia nigra of a rhesus monkey. Nissl stain (blue). Scale bar = 30 microns (0.03 millimeters).

The substantia nigra is made up of two parts, the pars compacta (SNpc) and the pars reticulata (SNpr), sometimes there is a reference to the pars lateralis but that is usually included as part of the pars reticulata. The ‘’black substance’’ that the term translates as, refers to the neuromelanin found in the dopaminergic neurons. These are found in a darker region of the SNpc. The SNpr is a lighter coloured region. There are similar cells in the substantia nigra and the globus pallidus. Both parts receive input from the striatopallidal fibres.

==== Pars compacta ====
The pars compacta is the most lateral part of the substantia nigra and sends axons to the superior colliculus. The neurons have high firing rates which make them a fast-spiking pacemaker and they are involved in ocular saccades.

==== Pars reticulata ====
The border between the SNpc and SNpr is highly convoluted with deep fringes. Its neuronal genus is the same as that of the pallidum, with the same thick and long dendritic trees. It receives its synapses from the striatum in the same way as the pallidum. Striatonigral axons from the striosomes may form columns vertically oriented entering deeply in the SNpr. The ventral dendrites of the SNpc from the reverse direction go also deeply in it. The SN also send axons to the pedunculopontine nucleus. and to the parafascicular part of the central complex. The SNpr is another "fast-spiking pacemaker" Stimulations provoke no movements. Confirming anatomical data, few neurons respond to passive and active movements (there is no sensorimotor map) "but a large proportion shows responses that may be related to memory, attention or movement preparation" that would correspond to a more elaborate level than that of the medial pallidum. In addition to the massive striatopallidal connection, the SNpr receives a dopamine innervation from the SNpc and glutamatergic axons from the pars parafascicularis of the central complex. It sends nigro-thalamic axons. There is no conspicuous nigro-thalamic bundle. Axons arrive medially to the pallidal afferences at the anterior and most medial part of the lateral region of the thalamus: the ventral anterior nucleus (VA) differentiated from the ventral lateral nucleus (VL) receiving pallidal afferences. The mediator is GABA.

=== Striatopallidonigral bundle ===
The striatopallidonigral connection is a very particular one. It engages the totality of spiny striatal axons. Estimated numbers are 110 million in man, 40 in chimpanzees and 12 in macaques. The striato-pallido-nigral bundle is made up of thin, poorly myelinated axons from the striatal spiny neurons grouped into pencils "converging like the spokes of a wheel" (Papez, 1941). It gives its "pale" aspect to the receiving areas. The bundle strongly stains for iron using Perls' Prussian blue (in addition to iron it contains many heavy metals including cobalt, copper, magnesium and lead).

==== Convergence and focusing ====
After the huge reduction in number of neurons between the cortex and the striatum (see corticostriate connection), the striatopallido-nigral connection is a further reduction in the number of transmitting compared to receiving neurons. Numbers indicate that, for 31 million striatal spiny neurons in macaques, there are only 166000 lateral pallidal neurons, 63000 medial pallidal, 18000 lateral nigral and 35000 in the pars reticulata. If the number of striatal neurons is divided by their total number, as an average, each target neuron may receive information from 117 striatal neurons. (Numbers in man lead to about the same ratio). A different approach starts from the mean surface of the pallidonigral target neurons and the number of synapses that they may receive. Each pallidonigral neuron may receive 70000 synapses. Each striatal neuron may contribute 680 synapses. This leads again to an approximation of 100 striatal neurons for one target neuron. This represents a huge, infrequent, reduction in neuronal connections. The consecutive compression of maps cannot preserve finely distributed maps (as in the case for instance of sensory systems). The fact that a strong anatomical possibility of convergence exists does not means that this is constantly used. A recent modeling study starting from entirely 3-d reconstructed pallidal neurons showed that their morphology alone is able to create a center-surround pattern of activity. Physiological analyses have shown a central inhibition/peripheral excitation pattern, able of focusing the pallidal response in normal conditions. Percheron and Filion (1991) thus argued for a "dynamically focused convergence". Disease, is able to alter the normal focusing. In monkeys intoxicated by MPTP, striatal stimulations lead to a large convergence on pallidal neurons and a less precise mapping. Focusing is not a property of the striatopallidal system. But, the very particular and contrasted geometry of the connection between striatal axons and pallidonigral dendrites offers particular conditions (the possibility for a very large number of combinations through local additions of simultaneous inputs to one tree or to several distant foci for instance). The disfocusing of the system is thought to be responsible for most of the parkinsonian series symptoms. The mechanism of focusing is not known yet. The structure of the dopaminergic innervation does not seem to allow it to operate for this function. More likely focusing is regulated by the upstream striatopallidal and corticostriatal systems.

==== Synaptology and combinatory ====
The synaptology of the striato- pallidonigral connection is so peculiar as to be recognized easily. Pallidonigral dendrites are entirely covered with synapses without any apposition of glia. This gives in sections characteristic images of "pallissades" or of "rosettes". More than 90% of these synapses are of striatal origin. The few other synapses such as the dopaminergic or the cholinergic are interspersed among the GABAergic striatonigral synapses. The way striatal axons distribute their synapses is a disputed point. The fact that striatal axons are seen parallel to dendrites as "woolly fibers" has led to exaggerate the distances along which dendrites and axons are parallel. Striatal axons may in fact simply cross the dendrite and give a single synapse. More frequently the striatal axon curves its course and follow the dendrite forming "parallel contacts" for a rather short distance. The average length of parallel contacts was found to be 55 micrometres with 3 to 10 boutons (synapses). In another type of axonal pattern the afferent axon bifurcates and gives two or more branches, parallel to the dendrite, thus increasing the number of synapses given by one striatal axon. The same axon may reach other parts of the same dendritic arborisation (forming "random cascades") With this pattern, it is more than likely that 1 or even 5 striatal axons are not able to influence (to inhibit) the activity of one pallidal neuron. Certain spatio-temporal conditions would be necessary for this, implying more afferent axons.

==== Pallidonigral outmaps ====
What is described above concerned the input map or "inmap" (corresponding to the spatial distribution of the afferent axons from one source to one target). This does not correspond necessarily to the output map or outmap (corresponding to the distribution of the neurons in relation to their axonal targets). Physiological studies and transsynaptic viral markers have shown that islands of pallidal neurons (only their cell bodies or somata, or trigger points) sending their axons through their particular thalamic territories (or nuclei) to one determined cortical target are organized into radial bands. These were assessed to be totally representative of the pallidal organisation. This is certainly not the case. Pallidum is precisely one cerebral place where there is a dramatic change between one afferent geometry and a completely different efferent one. The inmap and the outmap are totally different. This is an indication of the fundamental role of the pallidonigral set: the spatial reorganisation of information for a particular "function", which is predictably a particular reorganisation within the thalamus preparing a distribution to the cortex. The outmap of the nigra (lateralis reticulata) is less differentiated.

== Pars compacta and nearby dopaminergic elements ==
In strict sense, the pars compacta is a part of the core of basal ganglia core since it directly receives synapses from striatal axons through the striatopallidonigral bundle. The long ventral dendrites of the pars compacta indeed plunge deep in the pars reticulata where they receive synapses from the bundle. However, its constitution, physiology and mediator contrast with the rest of the nigra. This explains why it is analysed here between the elements of the core and the regulators. Ageing leads to the blackening of its cell bodies, by deposit of melanin, visible by naked eye. This is the origin of the name of the ensemble, first "locus niger" (Vicq d'Azyr), meaning black place, and then "substantia nigra" (Sömmerring), meaning black substance.

=== Structure ===
The densely distributed neurons of the pars compacta have larger and thicker dendritic arborizations than those of the pars reticulata and lateralis. The ventral dendrites descending in the pars reticulata receives inhibitory synapses from the initial axonal collaterals of pars reticulata neurons (Hajos and Greefield, 1994). Groups of dopaminergic neurons located more dorsally and posteriorly in the tegmentum are of the same type without forming true nuclei. The "cell groups A8 and A10" are spread inside the cerebral peduncule. They are not known to receive striatal afferences and are not in a topographical position to do so. The dopaminergic ensemble is thus also on this point inhomogeneous. This is another major difference with the pallidonigral ensemble. The axons of the dopaminergic neurons, that are thin and varicose, leave the nigra dorsally. They turn round the medial border of the subthalamic nucleus, enter the H2 field above the subthalamic nucleus, then cross the internal capsule to reach the upper part of the medial pallidum where they enter the pallidal laminae, from which they enter the striatum. They end intensively but inhomogeneously in the striatum, rather in the matrix of the anterior part and rather in the striosomes dorsalwards. These authors insit on the extrastriatal dopaminergic innervation of other elements of the basal ganglia system: pallidum and subthalamic nucleus.

=== Physiology ===
Contrarily to the neurons of the pars reticulata-lateralis, dopaminergic neurons are "low-spiking pacemakers", spiking at low frequency (0,2 to 10 Hz) (below 8, Schultz). The role of the dopaminergic neurons has been the source of a considerable literature. As the pathological disappearance of the black neurons was linked to the appearance of Parkinson's disease, their activity was thought to be "motor" . A major discovery has been that the stimulation of the black neurons had no motor effect. Their activity is in fact linked to reward and prediction of reward. In a recent review (Schultz 2007), it is demonstrated that phasic responses to reward-related events, notably reward-prediction errors, ...lead to ..dopamine release..." While it is thought that there could be different behavioral processes including long time regulation. Due to its widespread distribution, the dopaminergic system may regulate the basal ganglia system in many places.

== Regulators of the basal ganglia core ==
=== Subthalamic nucleus ===
As indicated by its name, the subthalamic nucleus is located below the thalamus; dorsally to the substantia nigra and medial to the internal capsule. The subthalamic nucleus is lenticular in form and of homogeneous aspect. It is made up of a particular neuronal species having rather long ellipsoid dendritic arborisations, devoid of spines, mimicking the shape of the whole nucleus. The subthalamic neurons are "fast-spiking pacemakers" spiking at 80 to 90 Hz. There are also about 7,5% of GABA microneurons participating in the local circuitry. The subthalamic nucleus receives its main afference from the lateral pallidum. Another afference comes from the cerebral cortex (glutamatergic), particularly from the motor cortex, which is too much neglected in models. A cortical excitation, via the subthalamic nucleus provokes an early short latency excitation leading to an inhibition in pallidal neurons. Subthalamic axons leave the nucleus dorsally. Except for the connection to the striatum (17.3% in macaques), most of the principal neurons are multitargets and feed axons to the other elements of the core of the basal ganglia. Some send axons to the substantia nigra medially and the medial and lateral nuclei of the pallidum laterally (3-target 21.3%). Some are 2-target with the lateral pallidum and the substantia nigra (2.7%) or the lateral pallidum and the medial(48%). Fewer are single target for the lateral pallidum. If one adds all those reaching this target, the main afference of the subthalamic nucleus is, in 82.7% of the cases, the lateral pallidum (external segment of the globus pallidus. While striatopallidal and the pallido-subthalamic connections are inhibitory (GABA), the subthalamic nucleus utilises the excitatory neurotransmitter glutamate. Its lesion resulting in hemiballismus is known for long. Deep brain stimulation of the nucleus suppress most of the symptoms of the Parkinson' syndrome, particularly dyskinesia induced by dopamine therapy.

==== Subthalamo-lateropallidal pacemaker ====
As said before, the lateral pallidum has purely intrinsic basal ganglia targets. It is particularly linked to the subthalamic nucleus by two-way connections. Contrary to the two output sources (medial pallidum and nigra reticulata), neither the lateral pallidum nor the subthalmic nucleus send axons to the thalamus. The subthalamic nucleus and lateral pallidum are both fast-firing pacemakers. Together they constitute the "central pacemaker of the basal ganglia" with synchronous bursts. The pallido-subthalamic connection is inhibitory, the subthalamo-pallidal is excitatory. They are coupled regulators or coupled autonomous oscillators, the analysis of which has been insufficiently deepened. The lateral pallidum receives a lot of striatal axons, the subthalamic nucleus not. The subthalamic nucleus receives cortical axons, the pallidum not. The subsystem they make with their inputs and outputs corresponds to a classical systemic feedback circuit but it is evidently more complex.

=== Central region of the thalamus ===
The centromedian nucleus is in the central region of the thalamus. In upper primates it has three parts instead of two, with their own types of neuron. Output from here goes to the subthalamic nucleus and the putamen. Its input includes fibers from the cortex and globus pallidus.

=== Pedunculopontine complex ===
The pedunculopontine nucleus is a part of the reticular formation in the brainstem and a main component of the reticular activating system, and gives a major input to the basal ganglia. As indicated by its name, it is located at the junction between the pons and the cerebral peduncle, and near the substantia nigra. The axons are either excitatory or inhibitory and mainly target the substantia nigra. Another strong input is to the subthalamic nucleus. Other targets are the GPi and the striatum. The complex receives direct afferences from the cortex and above all abundant direct afferences from the medial pallidum (inhibitory). It sends axons to the pallidal territory of the VL. The activity of the neurons is modified by movement, and precede it. All this led Mena-Segovia et al. (2004) to propose that the complex be linked in a way or another to the basal ganglia system. A review on its role in the system and in diseases is given by Pahapill and Lozano (2000). It plays an important role in awakeness and sleep. It has a dual role as a regulator of, and of being regulated by the basal ganglia.

== Outputs of the basal ganglia system ==
In the cortico-basal ganglia-thalamo-cortical loop the basal ganglia are interconnected, with little output to external targets. One target is the superior colliculus, from the pars reticulata. The two other major output subsystems are to the thalamus and from there to the cortex. In the thalamus the GPimedial fibers are separated from the nigral as their terminal arborisations do not mix. The thalamus relays the nigral output to the premotor and to the frontal cortices.

=== Medial pallidum to thalamic VL and from there to cortex ===
The thalamic fasciculus (H1 field) consists of fibers from the ansa lenticularis and from the lenticular fasciculus (H2 field), coming from different portions of the GPi. These tracts are collectively the pallidothalamic tracts and join before they enter the ventral anterior nucleus of the thalamus.

Pallidal axons have their own territory in the ventral lateral nucleus (VL); separated from the cerebellar and nigral territories. The VL is stained for calbindin and acetylcholinesterase. The axons ascend in the nucleus where they branch profusely. The VL output goes preferentially to the supplementary motor cortex (SMA), to the preSMA and to a lesser extent to the motor cortex. The pallidothalamic axons give branches to the pars media of the central complex which sends axons to the premotor and accessory motor cortex.

=== SNpr to thalamic VA and from there to cortex ===
The ventral anterior nucleus (VA) output targets the premotor cortex, the anterior cingulate cortex and the oculomotor cortex, without significant connection to the motor cortex.

== See also ==
- Motor systems
- Nervous system
- Telencephalon

== Sources ==
- Albin, R.L.; Young, A.B.; Penney, J.B. (1989). "The functional anatomy of basal ganglia disorders". Trends Neurosci. 12 (10): 366–375. doi:10.1016/0166-2236(89)90074-x. hdl:2027.42/28186. PMID 2479133. S2CID 8112392.
- Alexander, G.E.; Crutcher, M.D. DeLong (1990). "Basal ganglia-thalamocortical circuits: parallel substrates for motor, oculomotor, prefrontal and limbic functions". Prog. Brain Res. 85: 119–146. doi:10.1016/S0079-6123(08)62678-3. PMID 2094891.
- Arecchi-Bouchhioua, P; Yelnik, J; Francois, C; Percheron, G; Tande, D (1996). "3-D tracing of biocytin-labelled pallido-thalamic axons in the monkey". NeuroReport. 7 (5): 981–984. doi:10.1097/00001756-199604100-00005. PMID 8804035. S2CID 13647173.
- Arrechi-Bouchhioua, P.; Yelnik, J.; Percheron, G.; Tande, D. (1997). "Three dimensional morphology and distribution of pallidal axons projecting to both the lateral region of the thalamus and the central complex in primate". Brain Res. 754 (1–2): 311–314. doi:10.1016/S0006-8993(97)00181-9. PMID 9134990. S2CID 22327015.
- Bar-Gad, I; Heimer, G.; Ritov, Y; Bergman, H. (2003). "Functional correlations between neighbouring neurons in the primate globus pallidus are weak or non existent". J. Neurosci. 23 (10): 4012–4016. doi:10.1523/jneurosci.23-10-04012.2003. PMC 6741070. PMID 12764086.
- Bar-Gad, I, Morris, G., Bergman, H. (2003) Information processing, dimensionality, reduction and reinforcement in the basal ganglia. Progr. Neurobiol. 71: 439–477.
- Beckstead, R.M. and Frankfurter, A. (1982) The distribution and some morphological features of substantia nigra neurons that project to the thalamus, superior colliculus and pedunculopontine nucleus in monkey. Neuroscience. 7
- Beckstead, R.M.; Edwards, S.B.; Frankfurter, A. (1981). "A comparison of the intranigral distribution of nigrotectal neurons labeled with horseradish peroxidase in the monkey, cat and rat". J. Neurosci. 1 (2): 121–125. doi:10.1523/jneurosci.01-02-00121.1981. PMC 6564146. PMID 6167690.
- Brauer, K; Haüsser, M.; Härtig, W.; Arendt, T. (2000). "The shell-core dichotomy of nucleus accumbens in the rhesus monkey as revealed by double-immunofluorescence and morphology of cholinergic interneurons". Brain Res. 858 (1): 151–162. doi:10.1016/s0006-8993(00)01938-7. PMID 10700608. S2CID 6703723.
- Chan, C.S.; Shigemoto, R.; Mercer, J.N.; Surmeier, D.J. (2002). "HCN2 and HCN1 channels govern the regularity of autonomous pacemaking and synaptic resetting in globus pallidus neurons". J. Neurosci. 24 (44): 9921–32. doi:10.1523/jneurosci.2162-04.2004. PMC 6730257. PMID 15525777.
- Cossette, M.; Lecomte, F.; Parent, A. (2005). "Morphology and distribution of dopaminergic intrinsic to the human striatum". J. Chem. Neuroanat. 29 (1): 1–11. doi:10.1016/j.jchemneu.2004.08.007. PMID 15589697. S2CID 27777144.
- Czubayko, U.; Plenz, D. (2002). "Fast synaptic transmission between striatal spiny projecting neurons". Proc. Natl. Acad. Sci. 99 (24): 15764–15769. Bibcode:2002PNAS...9915764C. doi:10.1073/pnas.242428599. PMC 137790. PMID 12438690.
- DeLong, M.R. (1971). "Activity of the pallidum during movement". J. Neurophysiol. 34 (3): 417–424. doi:10.1152/jn.1971.34.3.414. PMID 4997823.
- DeLong, M.R. and Georgopoulos, A.P. (1980) Motor function of the basal ganglia. In Handbook of Physiology. I-Nervous system. Vol. II Motor control. Part 2. Ch.21. pp. 1017–1061
- diFiglia, M.; Pasik, P.; Pasik, T. (1982). "A Golgi and ultrastructural study of the monkey globus pallidus". J. Comp. Neurol. 212 (1): 53–75. doi:10.1002/cne.902120105. PMID 7174908. S2CID 20883939.
- Eblen, F; Graybiel (1995). "Highly restricted origin of prefrontal cortical inputs to striosomes in monkeys". J. Neurosci. 15 (9): 5999–6013. doi:10.1523/jneurosci.15-09-05999.1995. PMC 6577677. PMID 7666184.
- Fenelon, G.; Percheron, G.; Parent, A.; Sadikot, Fenelon; Yelnik, J. (1991). "Topography of the projection of the central complex of the thalamus to the sensorimotor striatal territory in monkeys". J. Comp. Neurol. 305 (1): 17–34. doi:10.1002/cne.903050104. PMID 1709648. S2CID 20878408.
- Fenelon, G. Yelnik; François, C. Percheron (1994). "Central complex of the thalamus: a quantitative analysis of neuronal morphology". J. Comp. Neurol. 342 (3): 463–479. doi:10.1002/cne.903420312. PMID 8021346. S2CID 40253006.
- Filion, M.; Tremblay, L.; Bédard, P.J (1988). "Abnormal influences of passive limb movement on the activity of globus pallidus neurons in parkinsonian monkeys". Brain Res. 444 (1): 165–176. doi:10.1016/0006-8993(88)90924-9. PMID 3359286. S2CID 37446463.
- Filion, M.; Tremblay, L. (1991). "Abnormal spontaneous activity of globus pallidus neurons in monkeys with MPTP-induced parkinsonism". Brain Res. 547 (1): 142–151. PMID 1677607.
- Flaherty, A.W; Graybiel, A.M. (1991). "Corticostriatal transformations in the primate somatosensory system . Projections from physiologically mapped body-part representations". J. Neurophysiol. 66 (4): 1249–1263. doi:10.1152/jn.1991.66.4.1249. PMID 1722244.
- Forel, A (1877). "Untersuchungen über die Haubenregion und ihre oberen Verknüpfungen im Gehirne des Menschen und einiger Säugethiere, mit Beiträgen zu den Methoden der Gehirnuntersuchung". Arch. Psychiatr. Nervenkr. 7 (3): 393–495. doi:10.1007/bf02041873. S2CID 19208861.
- Fox, C.A; Andrade, A.N; Lu Qui, I.J; Rafols, J.A. (1974). "The primate globus pallidus: a Golgi and electron microscopic study". J. Hirnforsch. 15 (1): 75–93. PMID 4135902.
- Francois, C; Percheron, G; Yelnik, J (1984). "Localization of nigrostriatal, nigrothalamic and nigrotectal neurons in ventricular coordinates in macaques". Neuroscience. 13 (1): 61–76. doi:10.1016/0306-4522(84)90259-8. PMID 6387531. S2CID 9162273.
- François, C.; Percheron, G.; Parent, A.; Sadikot, Fenelon; Yelnik, J (1991). "Topography of the projection from the central complex of the thalamus to the sensorimotor striatal territory in monkey". J. Comp. Neurol. 305 (1): 17–34. doi:10.1002/cne.903050104. PMID 1709648. S2CID 20878408.
- François, C.; Tande, D.; Yelnik, J.; Hirsh, E.C. (2002). "Distribution and morphology of nigral axons projecting to the thalamus in primates". J. Comp. Neurol. 447 (3): 249–260. doi:10.1002/cne.10227. PMID 11984819. S2CID 27105016.
- François, C.; Yelnik, J.; Percheron, G. (1996). "A stereotactic atlas of the basal ganglia in Macaques". Brain Res. Bull. 41 (3): 151–158. doi:10.1016/s0361-9230(96)00161-x. PMID 8886384.
- François, C.; Yelnik, J.; Percheron, G.; Tandé, D. (1994). "Calbindin-D-28K as a marker of the associative coertical territory of the striatum of macaques". Brain Res. 633 (1–2): 331–336. doi:10.1016/0006-8993(94)91557-1. PMID 8137167. S2CID 20893282.
- Goldman, P.S.; Nauta, W.J. (1977). "An intricately patterned prefronto-caudate projection in the rhesus monkey". J. Comp. Neurol. 72 (3): 369–386. doi:10.1002/cne.901710305. PMID 401838. S2CID 24398588.
- Haber, S. and Elde, R. (1981) Correlation between Met-enkephalin and substance P immunoreactivity in the primate globus pallidus. Neurosci. 6: 1291–1297.
- Hajos, M; Greenfield, S.A. (1994). "Synaptic connections between pars compacta and pars reticulata neurons: electophysiological evidence for functional modules within the substantia nigra". Brain Res. 660 (2): 216–224. doi:10.1016/0006-8993(94)91292-0. PMID 7820690. S2CID 45314308.
- Hikosaka, O. and Wurtz, R.H. (1989) The basal ganglia. in Wurtz and Goldberg (eds) The neurobiology of saccadic eye movements. Elsevier. Amsterdam.pp. 257–281
- Hoover, J.E.; Strick, P.L. (1993). "Multiple output channels in the basal ganglia". Science. 259 (5096): 819–821. Bibcode:1993Sci...259..819H. doi:10.1126/science.7679223. PMID 7679223. S2CID 22354209.
- Jarayaman, A.; Carpenter, M.B. (1977). "Nigrotectal projection in the monkey: an autoradiographic study". Brain Res. 135 (1): 147–152. doi:10.1016/0006-8993(77)91058-7. PMID 410480. S2CID 42257586.
- Jenkinson, N.; Nandi, D.; Oram, R.; Stein, J.F.; Aziz, T.Z. (2006). "Pedunculopontine nucleus electric stimulation alleviates akinesia independently of dopaminergic mechanisms". NeuroReport. 17 (6): 639–641. doi:10.1097/00001756-200604240-00016. PMID 16603926. S2CID 9815416.
- Kemp, J.M.; Powell, T.P.S. (1970). "The cortico-striate connection in the monkey". Brain. 93 (3): 525–546. doi:10.1093/brain/93.3.525. PMID 4990231.
- Kimura, M.; Yamada, H.; Matsumoto (2003). "Tonically active neurons in the striatum encode motivational contexts of actions". Brain and Development. 25: S20–S23. doi:10.1016/s0387-7604(03)90003-9. PMID 14980367. S2CID 24944480.
- Kitano, H.; Tanibuchi, I.; Jinnai, K. (1998). "The distribution of neurons in the substantia nigra pars reticulata with input from the motor, premotor and prefrontal areas of the cerebral cortex in monkeys". Brain Res. 784 (1–2): 228–238. doi:10.1016/s0006-8993(97)01332-2. PMID 9518627. S2CID 21105595.
- Künzle, H. (1975) Bilateral projections from precentral motor cortex to the putamen and other parts of the basal ganglia. an autoradiographic studyin Macaca fascicularis. Brain. Res. 88: 195–209.
- Lavoie, B. and Parent, A. (1994) Pedunculopontine nucleus in the squirrel monkey: projection to the basal ganglia as revealed by anterograde track tracing. J. Comp. Neurol.
- Levesque, M., Bédard, A., Cossette, M., Parent, A. (2003) Novel aspects of the chemical anatomy of the striatum and its efferent projections. Chem. Neuroanat. 26: 271–281.
- Levesque, M.; Parent, A. (1888). "The striatofugal fiber system in primates: a reevaluation of its organization based on single-axon tracing studies". PNAS. 102 (33): 11888–93. doi:10.1073/pnas.0502710102. PMC 1187973. PMID 16087877.
- Levesque, J.C.; Parent, A. (2005). "GABAergic interneurons in human subthalamic nucleus". Mov. Disord. 20 (5): 574–584. doi:10.1002/mds.20374. PMID 15645534. S2CID 9551517.
- Matsumoto, N.; Minamimoto, T; Graybiel, A.M; Kimura, M. (2001). "Neurons in the thalmic CM-Pf complex supply striatal neurons with information about behaviorally significant sensory events". J. Neurophysiol. 85 (2): 960–976. doi:10.1152/jn.2001.85.2.960. PMID 11160526. S2CID 9979051.
- Matsumura, M.; Watanabe, K.; Ohye, C. (1997). "Single-unit activity in the primate nucleus tegmenti pedunculopontinus related to voluntary arm movement". Neurosci. Res. 28 (2): 155–165. doi:10.1016/s0168-0102(97)00039-4. PMID 9220472. S2CID 40246590.
- Mesulam, M-M; Geula, C.; Bothwell, M.A.; Hersh, C.B. (1989). "Human reticular formation: cholinergic neurons of the pedunculopontine and the lateral dorsal tegmental nuclei and some cytochemical comparisons to forebrain cholinergic neurons". J. Comp. Neurol. 22 (4): 611–631. doi:10.1002/cne.902830414. PMID 2545747. S2CID 25154273.
- Middleton, F.A; Strick, P.L (1994). "anatomical evidence for cerebellar and basal ganglia involvement in higher cognitive function". Science. 266 (5184): 458–461. Bibcode:1994Sci...266..458M. doi:10.1126/science.7939688. PMID 7939688.
- Middleton, F.A; Strick, P.L (2002). "Basal ganglia "projections" to the prefrontal cortex of the primate. Cereb". Cortex. 12 (9): 926–935. doi:10.1093/cercor/12.9.926. PMID 12183392.
- Minamumoto, T.; Kimura, M. (2002). "Participation of the thalamic CM-Pf complex in attentional orienting". J. Neurophysiol. 87.
- Mink, J.W.; Thach, W.T. (1991). "Basal ganglia motor control .I. Non exclusive relation of pallidal discharge in five movement modes". J. Neurophysiol. 65 (2): 273–300. doi:10.1152/jn.1991.65.2.273. PMID 2016642.
- Mirto, D (1896). "Contributione alla fina anatomia della substantia nigra di Soemering e del pedunculo cerebrale dell'uomo". Riv. Sper. Fren. Med. Leg. 22: 197–210.
- Mouchet, P.; Yelnik, J. (2004). "Basic electronic properties of primate pallidal neurons as inferred from a detailed analysis of their morphology: a modeling study". Synapse. 54 (1): 11–23. doi:10.1002/syn.20060. PMID 15300880. S2CID 25253890.
- Munro-Davies, L.E.; Winter, J.; Aziz, T.Z.; Stein, J.F (1999). "The role of the pedunculopontine region in basal-ganglia mechanisms of akinesia. Exp". Brain Res. 129 (4): 511–517. doi:10.1007/s002210050921. PMID 10638425. S2CID 3068240.
- Nambu, A.; Tokuno, H; Hamada, I; Kita, H.; Himanishi, M.; Akazawa, T. Ikeuchi; Hasegawa, N. (2000). "Excitatory cortical inputs to pallidal neurons via the subthalamic nucleus in monkey". J. Neurophysiol. 84 (1): 289–300. doi:10.1152/jn.2000.84.1.289. PMID 10899204.
- Niimi, K.; Katayama, K.; Kanaseki, T.; Morimoto, K. (1960). "Studies on the derivation of the centre median of Luys". Tokushima J. Exp. Med. 2: 261–268.
- Olszewski, J. and Baxter, D. (1954, 2d ed 1982) Cytoarchitecture of the human brain stem. Karger. Basel.
- Pahapill, P.A.; Lozano, A. M. (2000). "The pedunculopontine nucleus and Parkinson's disease". Brain. 123 (9): 1767–1783. doi:10.1093/brain/123.9.1767. PMID 10960043.
- Parent, M. and Parent, M. (2004) The pallidofugal motor fiber system in primates. Park. Relat. Disord. 10: 203–211.
- Parent, M. and Parent, M. (2005) Single-axon tracing and three dimensional reconstruction of centre median-parafascicular thalamic neurons in primates. J. Comp. Neurol.
- Parent, M. (2006). "Single-axon tracing study of corticostriatal projections arising from primary motor cortex in primates". J. Comp. Neurol. 496 (2): 202–213. doi:10.1002/cne.20925. PMID 16538675. S2CID 32826599.
- Paxinos, G., Huang, X.F. and Toga, A.W. (2000) The rhesus monkey brain. Academic Press. San Diego
- Percheron, G. (1991) The spatial organization of information processing in the striato-pallido-nigral system. In Basal Ganglia and Movement disorders. Bignami. A. (ed).NINS Vol. III. Thieme. Stuttgart pp. 211–234.
- Percheron, G. (2003) Thalamus. In The human nervous system. Paxinos, G. and Mai, J. eds) Elsevier, Amsterdam
- Percheron, G.; Fénelon, G.; Leroux-Hugon, V.; Fève, A. (1994). "Histoire du système des ganglions de la base". Rev. Neurol. (Paris). 150: 543–554.
- Percheron, G.; Filion, M. (1991). "Parallel processing in the basal ganglia : up to a point". Trends Neurosci. 14 (2): 55–59. doi:10.1016/0166-2236(91)90020-u. PMID 1708537. S2CID 36913210.
- Percheron, G., François, C, Parent, A.Sadikot, A.F., Fenelon, G. and Yelnik, J. (1991) The primate central complex as one of the basal ganglia. In The Basal Ganglia III Bernardi, G. et al. (eds) pp. 177–186. Plenum . New York
- Percheron, G.; François, C.; Talbi, B.; Meder, J_F; Yelnik, J.; Fenelon, G. (1996). "The primate motor thalamus". Brain Res. Rev. 22 (2): 93–181. doi:10.1016/s0165-0173(96)00003-3. PMID 8883918.
- Percheron, G.; François, C.; Yelnik, J. (1987). "Spatial Organization and Information Processing in the Core of the Basal Ganglia". The Basal Ganglia II. Advances in Behavioral Biology. Vol. 32. pp. 205–226. doi:10.1007/978-1-4684-5347-8_14. ISBN 978-1-4684-5349-2.
- Percheron, G., François, C., Yelnik, J., Fenelon, G. (1989) The primate nigro-striato-pallido-nigral system . Not a mere loop. In Crossman, A.R and Sambrook, M.A (eds)Neural mechanisms in disorders of movements. Libey, London
- Percheron, G., François, C. and Yelnik, J. and Fenelon, G. (1994) The basal ganglia related system of primates: definition, description and informational analysis. In Percheron, G., McKenzie, J.S., Feger, J. (eds) The basal ganglia IV. Plenum Press New York pp. 3–20
- Percheron, G.; Yelnik, J.; François, C. (1984). "A Golgi analysis of the primate ganglia III. Spatial organization of the striatopallidal complex". J. Comp. Neurol. 227 (2): 214–227. doi:10.1002/cne.902270207. PMID 6470214. S2CID 1815939.
- Plenz, D.; Kitai, S.T. (1999). "A basal ganglia pacemaker formed by the subthalamic nucleus and external globus pallidus". Nature. 400 (6745): 677–682. Bibcode:1999Natur.400..677P. doi:10.1038/23281. PMID 10458164. S2CID 4356230.
- Prensa, L.; Cosette, M.; Parent, A. (2000). "Dopaminergic innervation of human basal ganglia". J. Chem. Anat. 20 (3–4): 207–213. doi:10.1016/s0891-0618(00)00099-5. PMID 11207419. S2CID 2480656.
- Sato, F.; Lavallée, P.; Levesque, M.; Parent, A. (2000). "Single-axon tracing study of neurons of the external segment of the globus pallidus in primate". J. Comp. Neurol. 417 (1): 17–31. doi:10.1002/(sici)1096-9861(20000131)417:1<17::aid-cne2>3.0.co;2-i. PMID 10660885. S2CID 84665164.
- Sato, F.; Parent, M.; Levesque, M.; Parent, A. (2000). "Axonal branching patterns of neurons of subthalamic neurons in primates". J. Comp. Neurol. 14 (1): 142–152. doi:10.1002/1096-9861(20000814)424:1<142::AID-CNE10>3.0.CO;2-8. PMID 10888744. S2CID 7586613.
- Selemon, L.D.; Goldman Rakic, P.S. (1985). "Longitudinal topography and interdigitation of corticostriatal projections in the rhesus monkey". J. Neurosci. 5 (3): 776–794. doi:10.1523/jneurosci.05-03-00776.1985. PMC 6565017. PMID 2983048.
- Sömmerring, T (1800). Hirn- und Nervenlehre, second edition, p. 31
- Surmeier, D.J.; Mercer, J.N.; Savio Chan, C. (2005). "Autonomous pacemakers in the basal ganglia: who needs excitatory synapses anyway?". Curr. Opin. Neurobiol. 15 (3): 312–318. doi:10.1016/j.conb.2005.05.007. PMID 15916893. S2CID 42900941.
- Terminologia anatomica (1998) Thieme, Stuttgart
- Tremblay, L.; Filion, M. (1989). "Responses of pallidal neurons to striatal stimulation in intact waking monkeys". Brain Res. 498 (1): 1–16. doi:10.1016/0006-8993(89)90394-6. PMID 2790460. S2CID 33401986.
- Tremblay, L.; Filion, M.; Bédard, P.J. (1988). "Responses of pallidal neurons to striatal stimulation in monkeys with MPTP-induced parkinsonism". Brain Res. 498 (1): 17–33. doi:10.1016/0006-8993(89)90395-8. PMID 2790469. S2CID 45190448.
- Vicq d'Azyr, (1786). Traité d'anatomie et de physiologie. Paris. p. 96
- Vogt, C. and O. (1941).Thalamusstudien I-III J Psychol Neurol 50 (1-2): 32-154.
- Wichmann, T.; Kliem, M.A. (2002). "Neuronal activity in the primate substantia nigra pars reticulata during the performance of simple and memory-guided elbow movements". J. Neurophysiol. 91 (2): 815–827. doi:10.1152/jn.01180.2002. PMID 14762150. S2CID 13609771.
- Yelnik, J.; François, C.; Percheron, G.; Heyner, S. (1987). "Golgi study of the primate substantia nigra. I. Quantitative morphology and typology of nigral neurons". J. Comp. Neurol. 265 (4): 455–472. doi:10.1002/cne.902650402. PMID 3123529. S2CID 6894626.
- Yelnik, J.; François, Percheron; Tandé, D. (1991). "Morphological taxonomy of the neurons of the primate striatum". J. Comp. Neurol. 313 (2): 273–94. doi:10.1002/cne.903130207. PMID 1722488. S2CID 26499221.
- Yelnik, J.; Percheron, G. (1979). "Subthalamic neurons in primates: a quantitative and comparative analysis". Neuroscience. 4 (11): 1717–1743. doi:10.1016/0306-4522(79)90030-7. PMID 117397. S2CID 40909863.
