= Zona incerta =

Region of gray matter cells in the subthalamus below the thalamus

Details

Identifiers
- Latin: zona incerta
- MeSH: D065820
- TA98: A14.1.08.707
- TA2: 5707
- FMA: 62038

The zona incerta (ZI) is a horizontally elongated small nucleus that separates the larger subthalamic nucleus from the thalamus. Its connections project extensively over the brain from the cerebral cortex down into the spinal cord.

Its function is unknown, though several potential functions related to "limbic–motor integration" have been proposed, such as controlling visceral activity and pain; gating sensory input and synchronizing cortical and subcortical brain rhythms. Its dysfunction may play a role in central pain syndrome. It has also been identified as a promising deep brain stimulation therapy target for treating Parkinson's disease.

Its existence was first described by Auguste Forel in 1877 as a "region of which nothing certain can be said". A hundred and thirty years later in 2007, Nadia Urbain and Martin Deschênes of Université Laval noted that the "zona incerta is among the least studied regions of the brain; its name does not even appear in the index of many textbooks."

== Structure ==
The zona incerta is situated between the lateral medullary lamina, and the cerebral peduncle. It extends between rostral pole of the thalamus rostrally, and the rostral pole of the medial geniculate nucleus caudally. This nucleus is located medially to the internal capsule, ventral to the thalamus, and is contiguous with the thalamic reticular nucleus. The nucleus separates the lenticular fasciculus from the thalamic fasciculus (also known as the field H_{1} of Forel.) Its cells are very heterogeneous differing widely in their shape and size. Its chemoarchitecture is also diverse containing up to 20 different types of neurochemically defined cells. It has been noted that "There are few diencephalic regions that have as much cellular and neurochemical diversity".

In the rat four areas are usually identified.

- a rostral sector that has densely packed spindle-shaped cells and scattered larger oval shaped cells.
- a dorsal sector that has medium-sized oval-shaped cells.
- a ventral sector made up of medium-sized multipolar or fusiform shaped cells that are more densely packed than the cells in the dorsal sector
- a caudal sector made up of small and medium-sized somata that are either multipolar, fusiform or rounded in shape, together with a group of very large multipolar-shaped cells located medially. This is sometimes called the motor part of the zona incerta nucleus. This is the area targeted by deep brain stimulation area when the zona incerta is targeted in the treatment of Parkinson Disease.

These areas lack clear cell-free borders and merge into each other.

Zona incerta neurons have dendrites with a wide span 0.8 mm and their axons give off collaterals that arborized locally within the zona incerta providing a means for lateral inhibition. The ventral area of the zona incerta has been described as having "a network of GABAergic cells with widespread interconnections, so that cells in one subsector may influence the activity of cells in a different subsector".

The zona incerta together with the hypothalamus is one of the two areas of the brain that produces the neuropeptide melanin concentrating hormone. Dopaminergic ones are also more prevalent. There are in addition populations of cells producing somatostatin, angiotensin II and melanocyte stimulating hormone.

=== Connections ===
The zona incerta has connections to the cerebral cortex, diencephalon, basal ganglia, brainstem and spinal cord.

Cerebral cortex

Projections to the zona incerta arise across the cortical mantel from the frontal to the occipital lobes. The heaviest projections are from cingulate cortex, frontal and parietal areas, but also projections from the medial prefrontal cortex have been reported. The head area of the body seems from these areas to have the largest representation in the zona incerta. These projections preferentially go to cortical layer I neurons. There are projections from the zona incerta back to the cerebral cortex.

Diencephalon

Projections with the diencephalon are reciprocal and mainly to the thalamus such as the intralaminar nucleus (parafascicular nucleus and central lateral nucleus) and higher-order nuclei such as the lateral posterior nucleus. The zona incerta avoids the thalamus nuclei of the primary sensory areas such as the ventral posterior nucleus of the somatosensory system and the lateral geniculate of the visual system. Rostral zona incerta also sends inhibitory projections to paraventricular thalamus with GABAergic neurotransmission.

Hypothalamus

Projections to the hypothalamus through incertohypothalamic pathway go mainly to the paraventricular nucleus areas in the anterior hypothalamus, lateral hypothalamus, lateral preoptic area, horizontal diagonal band of Broca, and the parvocellular region of the paraventricular nucleus.

Basal ganglia

Zona incerta is connected in the basal ganglia to the substantia nigra (both pars compacta and pars reticulata) and pedunculopontine tegmental nucleus (but only its pars dissipata area). It also has less important connections to the entopeduncular nucleus and globus pallidus. These projections are glutamatergic and excitatory rather than GABAergic and inhibitory. The zona incerta also receives input from these areas.

Cerebellum

The cerebellum sends a significant number of fibers to the zona incerta. These projections originate from various cerebellar nuclei and are glutamatergic. Given the cerebellar contributions to motor learning, timing and coordination, the interactions between the cerebellum with the zona incerta are likely to have profound influence on motor functions.

Brainstem

Zona incerta receives input from many parts of the brainstem nuclei including the periaqueductal gray, raphe nuclei, thalamic reticular nucleus, and the deep layers of the superior colliculus. It is regulated by inputs from brainstem cholinergic nuclei such as the Laterodorsal tegmental nucleus and pedunculopontine nucleus upon its neuron’s muscarinic receptors. The rostral zona incerta also innervates the dorsolateral and ventrolateral compartments of the periaqueductal gray.

Spinal cord

Zona incerta afferents terminate within the spinal cord gray matter, particularly the anterior horn, while spinal projections back to the zona incerta arise from cells located across the posterior horn and intermediate gray.

Other

Zona incerta also has connections to the amygdala, basal forebrain, the osmoreceptors in the subfornical organ, olfactory bulb, posterior pituitary and habenula.

Some of these projections appear in register; the representation of the same body part in cortex and spinal cord connect to the same areas in the zona incerta. This is possibly so with the superior colliculus.

Developmental retraction

In mice, connections to the cerebral cortex reach a peak around two weeks after birth, with some of them retracting reducing the density of its connections to that adults.

== Function ==
=== Visceral survival activities ===
Zona incerta controls such activities as water and food intake, sexuality and cardiovascular activity. This control is related to its effects upon the nearby posterior hypothalamus with which it shares similar connections and neurochemically defined cell types. Activation of GABA neurons in rostral zona incerta evokes binge eating behavior with a preference to sweet and high-fat food. The inhibitory projection from zona incerta to paraventricular thalamus contributes to binge-like eating produced by zona incerta GABA neuron activation.

Zona incerta has also been found to modulate both innate and learned defensive behaviors through its projections to the excitatory neurons of the dorsolateral and ventrolateral compartments of the periaqueductal gray. Activation of the GABAergic neurons in the rostral zona incerta reduces sound-induced innate flight response and conditioned freezing response. Somatostatin-expressing neurons coordinate the positive effects of a preweening infant's relationship with its mother damping its behavioral distress (crying) after separation upon reunion, a phenomenon contrary to their role in increasing anxiety in adults.

The zona incerta receives pain input through the spinothalamic tract and this has been shown to control the activity of the pain transmission pathway in the posterior thalamus.

Electrical or chemical stimulation of the zona incerta creates limbic-related movements, such as those associated with defense orientation and copulation.

=== Sensory-motor activities ===
At rest sensory input to the higher sensory areas of the cerebral cortex is gated through the thalamus. It has moreover been proposed that the zona incerta provides a top-down disinhibitory mechanism of this gating when there is sensory-motor activity such as the tactile use of whiskers.

This has also been linked to sensory gating changes between sleep and waking. In this occurs a zona incerta mediated inhibition of thalamic nuclei such the somatosensory posterior medial thalamus. This is most strong when cholinergic input to the zona incerta is reduced as during slow-wave sleep and during anesthesia. The consequence of this has been explained upon information processing:

As a result, posterior medial thalamus neurons fail to respond to ascending sensory inputs, and function primarily in "higher-order" mode, concerned with relaying trans-cortical information. By contrast, increased cholinergic activity during wakefulness and enhanced vigilance suppresses zona incerta -mediated inhibition, thereby ungating posterior thalamus responses to ascending inputs.

The zona incerta projects to the superior colliculus and these link to the initiation of orientating eye and head movements. In monkeys for example neuronal activity in the zona incerta "pauses" before the start of a saccade and resumes at the end of a saccade.

=== Synchronizing cortical and subcortical brain rhythms and integration ===
The GABAergic input received from the cerebral cortex has been suggested to synchronize thalamocortical and brainstem rhythms by providing a link between basal ganglia output and the cerebello-thalamo cortical loop. This allows it to synchronize oscillations generate by the basal ganglia during the preparation and execution of intended movements. One function of the loop is to carry movement instructions to the motor cortex through zona incerta output to the ventral lateral nucleus neurons in the cerebello-thalamocortical loop and to brainstem motor neurons in the medial reticular formation and midbrain extrapyramidal area. This acts to synchronize the basal ganglia areas involved in planning and execution of the movement with those in the brainstem controlling axial and proximal limb muscles with those areas in the motor cortex that control distal limb movements.

=== Synthesis ===
John Mitrofanis at the University of Sydney has proposed a general theory that might underlie some of the above.

The zona incerta is in a position to form a primal synaptic interface of the diencephalon, linking diverse sensory channels to appropriate visceral, arousal, attention and posture-locomotion responses. The different sensory inputs, whether exteroreceptive (somatic) or interoreceptive (visceral), influence these activities by driving zona incerta cells with different projection patterns and functions; each of these cells may be located in different sectors of the zone… In essence, it is suggested that the zona incerta has the pathways to integrate both exteroreceptive (e.g. somatosensory) and interoreceptive (e.g. thirst) sensory challenges, so that visceral activity, arousal, attention and/or posture locomotion are altered and/or generated. The zona incerta could form a neural niche in the thalamus from where these responses are "recruited" immediately, as to give an instant response.

== Clinical significance ==
=== Parkinson's disease ===
Parkinson's disease might disrupt the zona incerta as it is hyperactive in parkinsonian experimental animals. In humans with Parkinson's disease, surgical lesion of the zona incerta alleviates their parkinsonian motor symptoms.

Deep brain stimulation of the subthalamic nucleus in those with Parkinson's disease has identified the zona incerta as a promising target area for effective therapy. Unlike deep bilateral stimulation of the ventral lateral nucleus such stimulation of the zona incerta improves all aspects of tremor including both the distal and proximal parts of limbs and the body more generally. This also occurs without dysarthria and disequilibrium as this stimulation does not interrupt proprioceptive sensation and the processing of the fine motor skill movements of vocal cords.

Researchers observed that "The ventral lateral nucleus has long been established as an effective surgical target for controlling distal limb tremor, including Parkinson Disease tremor. However, because it receives predominantly cerebellar afferents and no direct basal ganglia afferents, the reason why it is effective in controlling Parkinson Disease tremor has remained a paradox. The conduction of abnormal oscillations generated in the basal ganglia in Parkinson Disease to the ventral lateral nucleus via zona incerta would therefore explain this paradox and also explain why we observed such a potent anti-tremor effect from stimulating zona incerta in our patients with Parkinson Disease"

The study further noted that deep brain stimulation upon the zona incerta "is effective in suppressing all components of tremor affecting both the distal and proximal part of the body. These results, if replicated in larger randomised controlled studies, have important implications for our current surgical management of patients with tremor and point to a more promising target area than the ventral lateral nucleus of the thalamus."

=== Central pain syndrome ===
Central pain syndrome is pain initiated or caused by injury or dysfunction in the central nervous system. Recent research suggests that the development and maintenance of such pain could link to abnormal inhibitory regulation by the zona incerta of the posterior thalamus. It has been suggested that there exists

a significant suppression of both spontaneous and evoked activity in inhibitory neurons in zona incerta and abnormally high spontaneous and evoked activity of neurons in posterior thalamus in animals with central pain syndrome. The positive association between behavioral and neurophysiological thresholds in rats with central pain syndrome is consistent with a causal role for suppressed incerto-thalamic inputs in central pain syndrome.
