= Karl Friedrich Burdach =

German physiologist (1776–1847)

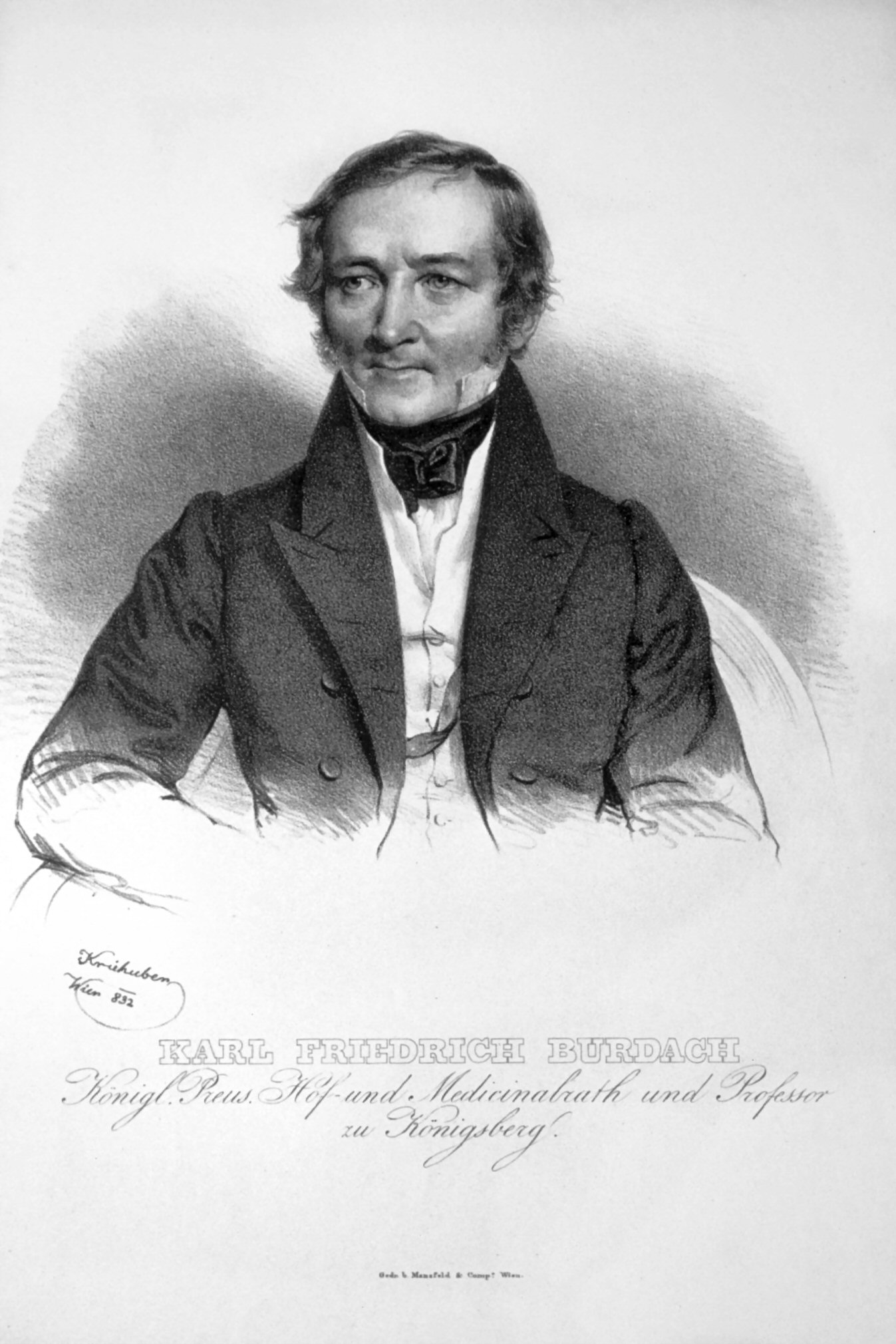
- Lithograph by Joseph Kriehuben (1800-1876)
- Born: 12 June 1776; Leipzig, Electorate of Saxony
- Died: 16 July 1847 (aged 71); Königsberg, Prussia

Karl Friedrich Burdach (12 June 1776 – 16 July 1847) was a German physiologist. He was one of the first to use the term "biology" in its modern sense and was a pioneer of neuroanatomy.

== Life ==
Burdach came from a family of physicians in Leipzig. He graduated in medicine at Leipzig in 1800 and trained in Vienna; became professor of physiology in the University of Dorpat in 1811, and four years later took a similar position at the University of Königsberg. He was influenced into Natural Philosophy by Friedrich Wilhelm Joseph von Schelling (1775–1854).

He provided in 1822 the name, due to the arching shape of its longest fibres, of the arcuate fasciculus, the term amygdala, and in 1800 the name "biology" in the modern sense of the term. He used the word biology and morphology as footnotes in his book Propädeutik zum Studium der gesammten Heilkunst. Burdach was an advocate of vitalism. He believed in a life force that "created the whole world and produced each living thing."

== Legacy ==
Burdach's work on the anatomy of the brain and nervous system introduced a number of names. It was published in three volumes Vom Baue und Leben des Gehirns (1819-1826). The column of Burdach or fasciculus cuneatus, the lateral portion of the dorsal funiculus of the spinal cord is named for him. He differentiated the caudate nucleus from the putamen and identified the globus pallidus and its inner and outer segments.

== Works ==
- Diatetik für Gesunde (1805)
- Enzyklopädie der Heilwissenschaft (three volumes, 1810–12)
- Vom Baue und Leben des Gehirns (three volumes, 1819, 1822, 1826), Leipzig, Dyk'schen Buchhandlung
- Neues Recepttaschenbuch für angehende Ärzte . 2., unveränd. Ausg. (1820) Digital edition by the University and State Library Düsseldorf
- Die Physiologie als Erfahrungswissenschaft (1826–40)
