= Isothalamus =

Structure in the brain

The isothalamus is a division used by some researchers in describing the thalamus.

The isothalamus constitutes 90% or more of the thalamus, and despite the variety of functions it serves, follows a simple organizational scheme. The constituting neurons belong to two different neuronal genera. The first correspond to the thalamocortical neurons (or principal). They have a "tufted" (or radiate) morphology, as their dendritic arborisation is made up of straight dendritic distal branches starting from short and thick stems. The number of branches and the diameter of the arborisation are linked to the specific system of which they are a part, and to the animal species. They have the rather rare property of having no initial axonal collaterals, which implies that one emitting thalamocortical neuron does not send information to its neighbor. They send long-range glutamatergic projections to the cerebral cortex where they end electively at the layer IV (or around) level.

The other genus is made up of microneurons. These have short and thin dendrites and short axons and thus belong to local circuitry neurons. Their percentage in comparison to thalamocortical neurons varies across species, highly increasing with evolution. Their short axonal parts contact thalamocortical or other local circuitry neurons. Their neurotransmitter is GABA.

The dendrites of the two constituting genera receive synapses from a variety of afferent axons. The connections back to the thalamocortical neurons create "triads" modulating the thalamocortical output. One subcortical afference comes from the perithalamus (reticulate nucleus). This receives axonal branches from thalamocortical neurons. Its afferences are also GABAergic. The number of perithalamic neurons strongly decreases in evolution in opposition to the large increase in microneurons (Arcelli et al. 1997). To some extent the perithalamus plays a role in the local circuitry. The circuitous connection with corticothalamic neurons participates in the elaboration of thalamic rhythms.

== Isothalamic parts or regions ==
The different functional modalities represented in the thalamus are segregated in specific anatomical regions, differentiated by the cerebral systems from where they receive their afferent projections. There are more corticothalamic than thalamocortical axons. Corticothalamic endings are of two kinds. The "classical" projection emanates from layer VI of the cortex, the axons are thin and have a long, almost straight, trajectory through the thalamus, not respecting intrathalamic borders. They emit only short perpendicular collaterals, the arborization form in a thin cylinder (Globus and Scheibel). Their terminal synapses are glutamatergic. The second kind of corticothamic axons is the Rockland type II (1994). This emanates from larger pyramidal cells and is much thicker. Its ending is small, dense and globular. Its synapses are located close to the soma of the thalamic neuron, often forming the center of glomerular complexes. The isothalamus serves the function of transforming and distributing "prethalamic" information to the cortex.

The thalamic parts delineated by the lamellar and cellular "limiting" elements, according to the founding system of Burdach (1822), constituted the classic thalamic nuclei. These have been later further subdivided. The Louvain symposium (in Dewulf, 1971) made the recommendation to call the classical subdivisions "region". One region may be made up of one or several nuclei. These may have one (or several) partes, if there is a particular coafference for instance.

The region separated by the superior lamella is the Anterior region (A). The region separated medially by the medial lamina is the Lateral region (L). Almost separated from the thalamic mass are the Geniculate bodies (G). The remaining isothalamus is made up of the medial region (M, medial to the medial lamina) and posteriorly, with no complete separation in man, of the posterior regio or pulvinar (Pu). The last two represent a huge medioposterior ensemble. The classical separation into relay nuclei, receiving "specific" subcortical afferences or association nuclei, which would not, cannot be retained as absolute. The lateral region and the geniculate bodies indeed receive strong lower "specific" afferences and can be seen as the "sensorimotor" part of the thalamus. The medioposterior ensemble, in most of its volume does not receive subcortical afferents and abundant afferences from the "associative" cortex but in some, essentially ventral parts, in fact receives subcortical afferences, such as tectal, spinothalamic or amygdalar. The anterior region receives a particular afference that is not entirely subcortical (directly or indirectly from the subiculum).

Thalamic regions may be functionally inhomogeneous. The elements of the lateral region have been frequently separated into ventral and dorsal (in fact named lateral) nuclei. This subdivision no more hold true. Cytoarchitectonics have partly failed. What differentiates anatomofunctional parts are the major afferent systems present in the thalamus as terminal parts of axons and axonal arborisations. Three-dimensional analyses of the distribution of all the axonal ending coming from the same source show that they occupy together an own space in the thalamus, which is called a territory. Such a main territory do no mix or overlap in primates with neighbouring territories (Percheron et al. 1998). This is what made possible a solid partition of the thalamus. These territories may cover one or several nuclei. The analyses of the three-dimensional geometry of the main afferent territories in macaques have shown that a dorsal element on transverse sections is simply the posterior part of the preceding territory. There are thus no "dorsal nuclei". This is one reason why the nomenclature selected by the Nomina anatomica and the Terminologia Anatomica (1998) is hardly applicable. The evolution of the thalamus follows that of the cortex and there are differences including between primates (new world monkeys and old world; old world and humans), which means that a universal nomenclature valid in all species is not simply reachable.

=== Superior region S (including the anterior A nucleus) ===
The superior region comprises two elements that were linked during a long time and were later wrongly separated: the nucleus anterior and the nucleus superficialis, or superior (previous nucleus lateralis dorsalis). The nucleus anterior, divided into several entities in non-human species, is undivided in man. The two, anterior and superficial, nuclei are separated from the lateral and medial regions by the lamella superior and are everywhere surrounded by a capsule of white matter, including the lamina terminalis. The second nucleus (superficialis or superior) is posterior and in succession to the first. The two are constituted in the same manner. The main difference is their mode of afference. Both receives information from the subiculum of the hippocampus but in one case indirectly and in the other directly. The efferent axons of the subiculum follow the fornix. At the anterior part of the fornix, part of them go down to the mammillary body. The neurons of the mammillary bodies give axons forming the thick and dense mamillo-thalamic tract (of Vicq d'Azyr), which ends in the nucleus anterior. Another part of the subicular axons does not end in the mamillary body as, at the level of the foramen of Monro, they turn posteriorly. Some of them end into the anterior nucleus but a great quantity end in the nucleus superficialis. The selective target of the efferent axons from the anterior nucleus is the anterior cingulate cortex, that of the superfial nucleus is the posterior cingulate, with some overlap. The axons of these parts of the cingulate cortex, linked through the large cingulum (longitudinal bundle located at the base of the cingulate cortex), return to the parahippocampal gyrus. This circuit referred to as the Papez circuit (1937) was said by its author to be the substrate for emotion. There have been many further other elaborations (including the "limbic system"). Papez' circuit was in fact not close (at hippocampal level). In addition, the second nucleus, the superficial nucleus, not taken into consideration, has similar connections and participates in other close or linked circuits. The better known effect of the lesion of mamillary bodies, of the mamillothamic bundle and the fornix, if bilateral, is a particular (anterograde) amnesia (Korsakoff syndrome).

=== Medial region: Medial nucleus ===
The medial dorsal nucleus corresponds to the part which is located medial to the lamina medialis. In the anterior part of the lamina, the oral intralaminar cellular part makes a clear border. This is no more true posteriorly with the pulvinar. Due to their constitution and connection, the two constitute a common set corresponding to the largest mass of the human thalamus. In non human primates, the medial nucleus (often named dorsomedian) is subdivided into several subnuclei. It is admitted that this is no longer the case in humans, which makes comparison even with old world monkeys difficult. Some subcortical afferences are documented in macaques (amygdalar, tectal). There are no arguments in favour of their existence in humans. The majority of the afferences comes from the cortex, reciprocated by corticothalamic efferences. In macaques, the spatial distribution of the connection was said to be "circunferential", and medial cortical areas being linked to medial parts of the nucleus and lateral dorsal to lateral dorsal. This is also true in humans. The strong interrelation between the medial nucleus and the frontal cortex is known for long. Lobotomies were intended to cut this connection. There are however other mediocortical connections; with the cingulate cortex, the insular cortex and also with the premotor cortex.

=== Posterior region. Pulvinar. Pu (with "LP" as a part) ===
Pulvinar means pillow in Latin. It constitutes the posterior pole of the thalamus and its posterior border is indeed smooth. Anteriorly there is only an incomplete boundary with the medial nucleus. The two have in fact common connections both thalamocortical and corticothalamic. This is the case for instance for the frontal cortex. The usual subdivisions do not fit with the distribution of cortical afferent. It is common to find the description of a "nucleus lateralis posterior ( LP). This is simply a part of the pulvinar passing over the lateral region and giving in transverse sections the image of a ventral and a dorsal (or lateral) subdivision. Sagittal sections show that the pulvinar(LP) ensemble is a single curved entity. The whole receives in the same almost identical afferences. A main medial part receives flat islands of axonal terminations from the frontal, parietal, temporal and preoccipital cortex. Only one part of the pulvinar is particular, the intergeniculate or inferior pulvinar, which receives tectal afferents and which has a visuotopic map.

=== Basal region B ===
In the postero inferior part of the thalamus is a place which raises unsolved problems. This is a place of endings of spinothalamic terminal axonal arborisations. The spinothalamic tracts ends in three "lateral elements", the VCP, VCO, and VIm. Secondly, it ends, close to these, in intralaminar-limitans elements. The third place of ending, the basal formation (not a classical nucleus, in a place that was attributed to lower pulvinar), is particular only in one place named the nucleus basalis nodalis that was claimed by some to be the only relay of pain messages from layer I of the spinal cord. This place has been shown to send axons to the insula. In fact VCP also conveys painful stimuli.

==== Geniculate region. G ====
This is made up of the two "geniculate bodies" (knee-form bodies) that are located ventrally at the surface of the thalamus, below the pulvinar. They are "relays" of highly specific functions: audition for the first and vision for the second. They differentiate early in ontogenesis and totally, for the lateral or partially for the medial separate from the thalamic mass. They are however specialized but authentical isothalamic elements.

===== Medial geniculate nucleus GM =====
The medial geniculate nucleus receives axons from auditory axons. From the cochlea, peripheral auditory information goes to the cochlear nucleus. From there, through the cochlear nerve, axons reach the superior olivary complex of both sides. Axons from there constitute the lateral lemniscus which ends in the inferior colliculus. Axons from the inferior colliculus constitute the brachium of the inferior colliculus and end in the medial geniculate. The thalamocortical axons from the medial geniculate nucleus end in the primary auditory cortex located in the center of the superior temporal plane. See auditory system.

===== Lateral geniculate nucleus GL =====
The lateral geniculate nucleus is made up of different cellular strata separated by lamellae, parallel to the surface. Strata 1 and 2, the most ventral, are magnocellular. The others are mediocellular. From the retina, the axons of the optic nerves go directly to the lateral geniculate nucleus. The nasal component of the optic nerves (the axons issued from the nasal field of the retina of both sides) crosses at the chiasma. The axons of the temporal field do not cross. This is very important in clinical neurology.

After the chiasma, axons form the visual tracts turn around the peduncles and arrive into the polar anterior part of the lateral geniculate nucleus. Retinal axons from the contralateral retina end in strata 1, 4 and 6. Those from the ipsilateral retina end in 2, 3 and 5. The axons from the lateral geniculate nucleus, through the optic radiation, end in the primary visual cortex around the calcarine fissure. See visual system.

==== Lateral region L (or V) ====
This corresponds to the part of isothalamus located laterally to the medial lamina and in front of the pulvinar (the noyau externe of Dejerine after Burdach). It receives abundant and diverse infrathalamic afferences. Some main afferent systems occupy a particular portion in the lateral region. Several "main territories" are spatially separate. This allows functionally significant subdivisions. Other afferent systems may end in one or the other main territories to which they are coterritories. Still other can end in several main territories. The topographic description of the territories was made using experiments in monkeys. This showed that they are no dorsal nuclei. What was believed to be dorsal was simply the posterior extension of the more anterior territory. This makes it difficult to follow the Terminologia anatomica (1998). To follow common usage, lateral nuclei are called "ventral". It is today possible to transfer the data experimentally obtained in monkeys to the human brain using immunostaining. The sequence described by C. Vogt (1909) hold true. Starting from caudally one may describe the lemniscal territory, made up of two components cutaneous or tactile and deep (musculoarticular), the cerebellar territory also made up of two nuclei, the pallidal territory and the nigral territory .

===== Gustatory territory VArc =====
Tied to VCM into the classic arcuate nucleus (in fact heterogeneous), it has neurons of an own type. Also, it does not receive lemniscal afferent and is thus not a part of VC. It receives axons from the nucleus of the solitary tract. Its thalamocortical neurons send axons to the primary gustatory area located in the opercule of the insula.

===== Tactile lemniscal territory VPC=VPL+VPM =====
The nuclei corresponding to the lemniscal territory are called VP. The tactile part nucleus ventralis posterior caudalis VPC is the posterior part of the lateral region, in front of the pulvinar. It is the addition of a lateral nucleus VPL and of the superior part of the classic arcuate nucleus VPM. VPC receives axons from the dorsal column nuclei located in the lower medulla oblongata: the nucleus gracilis (Goll) medial and the nucleus cuneatus (Burdach) lateral. Starting from these nuclei, axons go ventralwards and decussate (to the other side) still in the medulla oblongata forming the "lemniscal decussation". Axons from the two sides form the thick medial lemniscus close to the midline. Higher, it separates in order to reach the lower border of the two VPC. In this nucleus, the axons terminate forming lamellae and a somatotopic map. The axons conveying information from the leg are the most lateral and the most dorsal. Those conveying information from the mouth and tongue are the most medial and ventral (in VPM). The axonal arborisations are rather small and very dense. The mediator of the lemniscus system is glutamate. The thalamocortical axons of the VPC send their axons to the primary somatosensory area (areas 3b and 1) where there is also a clear somatotopic map.

===== Deep lemniscal territory VPO (or VPS) =====
Within the somesthetic nucleus, physiological maps, including in humans, have found a spatial separation between the representation of the tactile and the deep stimuli. Friedman and Jones (1986) designated the deep region the "shell" as opposed to the tactile "core". Kaas et al. (1986) initially retained one VPO and one VPS. The present nucleus ventralis posterior oralis VPO is the addition of the two. This, made up very large neurons, the largest of the thalamus, is located in front and superior to the VPC. It receives axons from the accessory cuneate nucleus of the medulla. The axons of this nucleus conveys information from muscles, tendons and joints. They decussate and participate in the formation of the medial lemniscus. The VPO which receives "deep" information has about the same somatotopic map as the tactile. The thalamocortical neurons from VPO send their axons in the fundic area 3a (in the depth of the Rolando sulcus) and to the parietal area 5.

===== Cerebellar territory VIm or VL =====
The nucleus ventralis intermedius receives through the brachium conjunctivum axons from all cerebellar nuclei, more particularly from the dentate nucleus (Percheron, 1977, Asanuma et al. 1983). The mediator is glutamate. In primates, the dentate nucleus is subdivided into two nuclei: one anterior and the other posteroventral, the first "motor" and the other not (Dum and Strick, 2002). VIm is in fact made up of two parts, one ventrolateral (VImL) and one dorsomedian (VImM). VImL (the VIm of neurosurgeons) receives electively sensorimotor information. VImL also receives axons from the vestibulum and from the spinothalamic tract. It is organized according to a somatotopic map grossly analogous to that of VPC. The cortical target of the VImL thalamocortical neurons is principally the primary motor cortex (prerolandic) (Schell and Strick, 1984, Orioli and Strick, 1989) . VImM receives mainly "associative" information from the dentate, plus tectal and spinothalamic information. It is organized according to another map, looser than that of VImL. Its thalamocortical neurons send their axons to the premotor and to the parietal cortex. As it was not clearly distinguished, there are poor physiological data.

===== Pallidal territory VO =====
Starting from cercopithecidae, the two sources from the basal ganglia system medial pallidum and nigra have distinct, spatially separate, thalamic territories. The pallidal territory arrives in evolution as a lateral addition to the nigal VA, forming a new nucleus individualized by another name : the nucleus ventralis oralis, VO. On the contrary there is no more VM (which receives convergent afferences in rodents and carnivora). VO receives its pallidal afferent axons from the medial pallidum. The trajectory of pallidal afferent axons is complex. Axons form first the ansa lenticularis and the fasciculus lenticularis which place the axons on the medial border of the pallidum. From there, the axons cross the internal capsule as the comb system. Axons arrives at the lateral border of the subthalamic nucleus. They pass over it as the H2 field of Forel (1877) then turn down at H and suddenly go up in H1 in direction to the inferior border of the thalamus. The distribution of pallidal axons within the territory is wide with terminal "bunches" (Arrechi-Bouchhioua et al. 1996,1997, Parent and Parent, 2004 ). This offers few chance for a fine somatotopic organization. The territory is stained for calbindin. The mediator of the pallido-thalamic connection is the inhibitor GABA. The thalamocortical neurons send their axons to the supplementary motor area (SMA), preSMA, the premotordorsal and medial and to a lesser extent to the motor cortex.

===== Nigral territory VA =====
The nigral afferences come from the pars reticulata of the substantia nigra. The axons do not constitute a conspicuous bundle. They are placed medially to the pallidal and ascend almost vertically. A part of the territory is posterior and inferior going up to the anterior pole of the central complex. This part sometimes designated as VM is simply the posterior continuation of the nigral territory. There is indeed no more VM in the upper primates where the pallidal and nigral territories are everywhere separated. In the whole territory axons expand widely (François et al., 2002) allowing no precise map, which is confirmed by physiology (Wichemann and Kliem, 2004). VA is crossed by the mammillothalamic bundle. The mediator of the nigro-thalamic connection is, as for the pallido-thalamic the inhibitor GABA. In addition to nigral, VA receives amygdalar and tectal (superior colliculus) axons. The thalamo-cortical axons go to the frontal cortex, the cingulate cortex, the premotor cortex and the oculomotor fields FEF and SEF. It is important to stress the necessity from now to clearly distinguish the pallidal VO and the nigral VA territories. The fact that they do not lead to the same cortical areas and systems is alone one reason for this. The physiology of the two territories is also different (van Donkelaar et al., 1999).
