= Thalamic fasciculus =

Anatomical feature of the brain

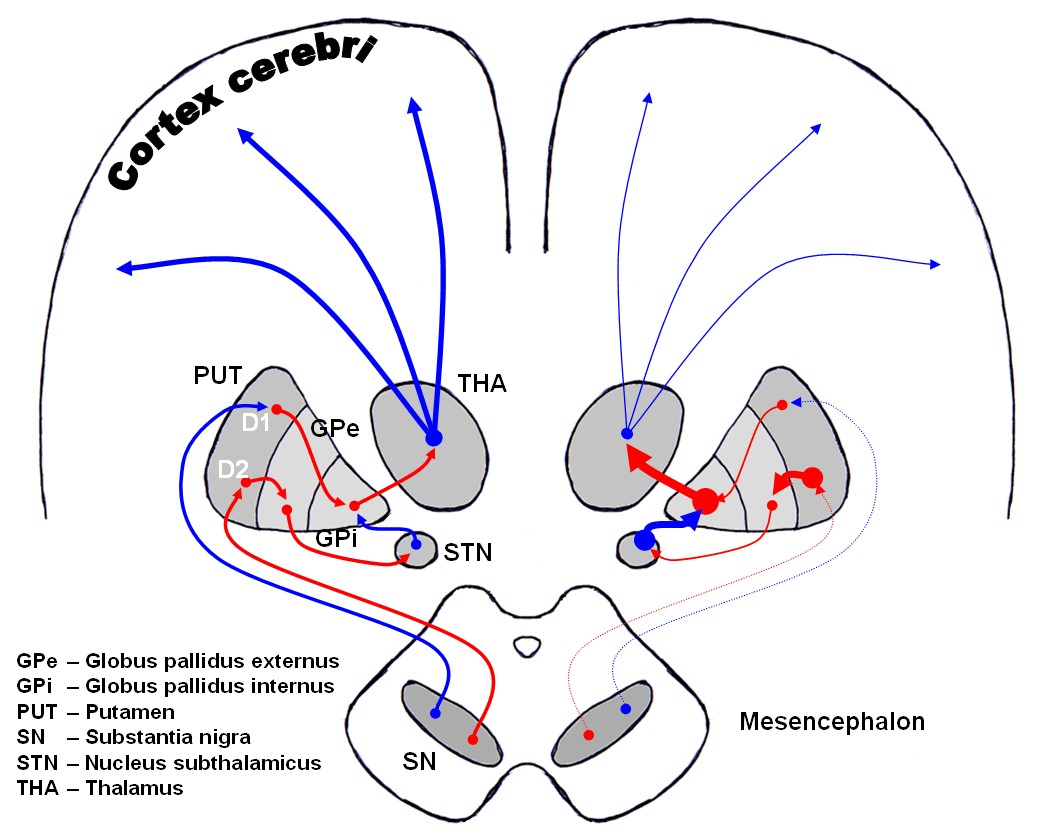
- The image shows dopaminergic pathways of the human brain in normal condition (left) and Parkinsons Disease (right). Red Arrows indicate suppression of the target, blue arrows indicate stimulation of target structure. (Thalamic fasciculus visible but not labeled, as red line from GPi to THA.)

Details

Identifiers
- Latin: fasciculus thalamicus
- NeuroNames: 439
- TA98: A14.1.08.679; A14.1.09.523
- TA2: 5756
- FMA: 62065

The thalamic fasciculus is a component of the subthalamus (ventral thalamus). It is synonymous with field H_{1} of Forel. Fibers from the lenticular fasciculus (field H_{2} of Forel), are joined by fibers from the ansa lenticularis – different parts of the internal globus pallidus, before they enter the ventral anterior nucleus of the thalamus to form the thalamic fasciculus. The fasciculus also contains fibers from the cerebellothalamic tract, and the pallidothalamic tract.

== See also ==
- Zona incerta
