= Fields of Forel =

Complex region in the posterior subthalamus

Identifiers
- NeuroLex ID: nlx_86272

The fields of Forel is a complex region in the posterior subthalamus, consisting of a concentrated collection of bundles of fibers. The tracts formed include the thalamic fasciculus that includes the ansa lenticularis and lenticular fasciculus, cerebellothalamic tracts, and pallidothalamic tracts. Other included fibers connect to other brain regions. These tracts are described in regions known as H fields.

== H fields ==
- Field H_{1}, is the thalamic fasciculus, a horizontal white matter tract composed of the ansa lenticularis, lenticular fasciculus, and cerebellothalamic tracts between the subthalamus and the thalamus. These fibers are projections to the ventral anterior and ventral lateral thalamus from the basal ganglia (globus pallidus) and the cerebellum. H_{1} is separated from H_{2} by the zona incerta.
- Field H_{2} (synonymous with lenticular fasciculus) is also made up of projections from the pallidum to the thalamus, but these course the subthalamic nucleus (dorsal).
- Field H (sometimes called field H_{3}) is a large zone of mixed grey and white matter from the pallidothalamic tracts of the lenticular fasciculus and the ansa lenticularis which combine in an area just in front of the red nucleus. The grey matter from this field is said to form a prerubral nucleus.

== Nuclei campi perizonalis ==
Nuclei campi perizonalis or the nuclei of the perizonal fields (of Forel) are a group of nuclei in the subthalamus, (or ventral thalamus).They comprise 3 groups of nuclei arranged as follows:

- Nucleus campi medialis: the nucleus of prerubral field (field H)
- Nucleus campi dorsalis: Neurons scattered along the thalamic fasciculi in field H1 of Forel
- Nucleus campi ventralis: Neurons scattered along the lenticular fasciculi in field H2 of Forel
