= Dentatothalamic tract =

Brain structure

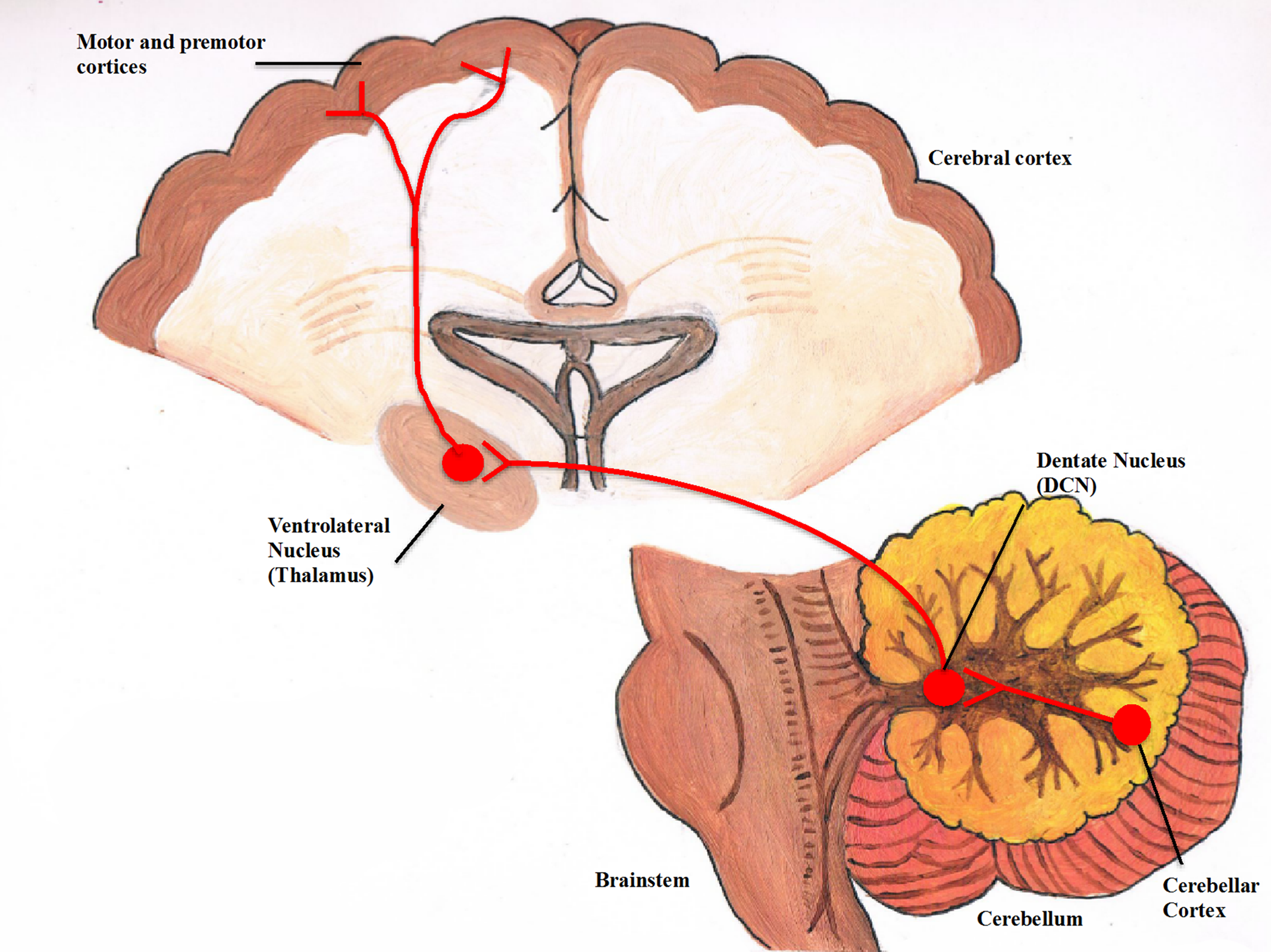
- The cerebello-dentato-thalamo-cortical pathway. The figure depicts the pathway from the cerebellum to the motor cortex, via the ventrolateral nucleus of the thalamus.

- Tractography of dentatothalamic tract.

Details

Identifiers
- Latin: tractus dentatothalamicus
- NeuroNames: 534
- NeuroLex ID: birnlex_1104
- TA2: 5847
- FMA: 72462

The dentatothalamic tract (or dentatorubrothalamic tract) is a tract which originates in the dentate nucleus, follows the ipsilateral superior cerebellar peduncle, decussates later on reaching the contralateral red nucleus and the contralateral thalamus.

The term "dentatorubrothalamocortical" is sometimes used to emphasize termination in the cerebral cortex.

== Additional images ==
3D data of the dentatothalamic tract. Reonctructed using tractography.

== See also ==
- Cerebellothalamic tract
- Red nucleus
