= Subthalamic nucleus =

Small lens-shaped nucleus in the brain

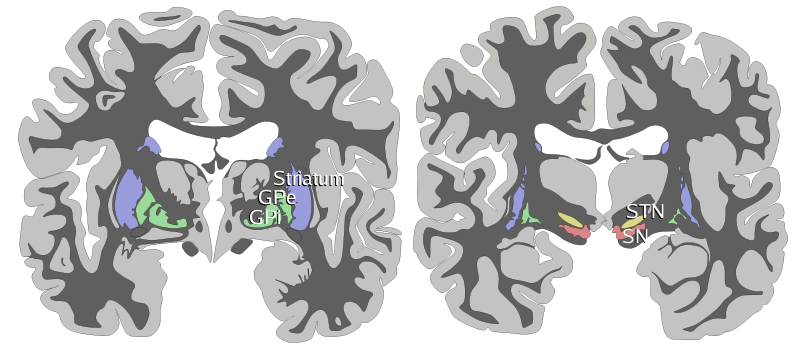
- Coronal slices of human brain showing the basal ganglia (external globus pallidus (GPe) and internal globus pallidus (GPi)), subthalamic nucleus (STN) and substantia nigra (SN).

- DA-loops in Parkinson's disease

Details
- Part of: Subthalamus (physically); basal ganglia (functionally)

Identifiers
- Latin: nucleus subthalamicus
- Acronym: STN
- MeSH: D020531
- NeuroNames: 435
- NeuroLex ID: nlx_anat_1010002
- TA98: A14.1.08.702
- TA2: 5709
- FMA: 62035

The subthalamic nucleus (STN), also known as nucleus of Luys, is a small lens-shaped nucleus in the brain where it is, from a functional point of view, part of the basal ganglia system. In terms of anatomy, it is the major part of the subthalamus. As suggested by its name, the subthalamic nucleus is located ventral to the thalamus. It is also dorsal to the substantia nigra and medial to the internal capsule.

== Anatomy ==
Structural connectivity of the human subthalamic nucleus as visualized through diffusion-weighted MRI.

=== Structure ===
The principal type of neuron found in the subthalamic nucleus has rather long, sparsely spiny dendrites. In the more centrally located neurons, the dendritic arbors have a more ellipsoidal shape. The dimensions of these arbors (1200 μm, 600 μm, and 300 μm) are similar across many species—including rat, cat, monkey and human—which is unusual. However, the number of neurons increases with brain size as well as the external dimensions of the nucleus. The principal neurons are glutamatergic, which give them a particular functional position in the basal ganglia system. In humans there are also a small number (about 7.5%) of GABAergic interneurons that participate in the local circuitry; however, the dendritic arbors of subthalamic neurons shy away from the border and primarily interact with one another.

The structure of the subthalamic nucleus has not yet been fully explored and understood, but it is likely composed of several internal domains. The primate subthalamic nucleus is often divided in three internal anatomical-functional domains. However, this so-called tripartite model has been debated because it does not fully explain the complexity of the subthalamic nucleus in brain function.

=== Afferent axons ===
The subthalamic nucleus receives its main input from the external globus pallidus (GPe), not so much through the ansa lenticularis as often said but by radiating 'comb' fibers crossing the medial pallidum first and the internal capsule (forming part of Edinger's comb system, see figure), as well as the ansa subthalamica. These afferents are GABAergic, inhibiting neurons in the subthalamic nucleus. Excitatory, glutamatergic inputs come from the cerebral cortex (entire frontal cortex with a predominance for motor, premotor and oculomotor input to the posterolateral part of the nucleus), and from the pars parafascicularis of the central complex. The subthalamic nucleus also receives neuromodulatory inputs, notably dopaminergic axons from the substantia nigra pars compacta. It also receives inputs from the pedunculopontine nucleus.

=== Efferent targets ===
The axons of subthalamic nucleus neurons leave the nucleus dorsally. The efferent axons are glutamatergic (excitatory). Except for the connection to the striatum (17.3% in macaques), most of the subthalamic principal neurons are multitargets and directed to the other elements of the core of the basal ganglia. Some send axons to the substantia nigra medially and to the medial and lateral nuclei of the pallidum laterally (3-target, 21.3%). Some are 2-target with the lateral pallidum and the substantia nigra (2.7%) or the lateral pallidum and the medial (48%). Less are single target for the lateral pallidum. In the pallidum, subthalamic terminals end in bands parallel to the pallidal border. When all axons reaching this target are added, the main efference of the subthalamic nucleus is, in 82.7% of the cases, clearly the internal globus pallidus (GPi).

Some researchers have reported internal axon collaterals. However, there is little functional evidence for this.

== Physiology ==
Anatomical overview of the main circuits of the basal ganglia. Subthalamic nucleus is shown in red. Picture shows 2 coronal slices that have been superimposed to include the involved basal ganglia structures. + and - signs at the point of the arrows indicate respectively whether the pathway is excitatory or inhibitory in effect. Green arrows refer to excitatory glutamatergic pathways, red arrows refer to inhibitory GABAergic pathways and turquoise arrows refer to dopaminergic pathways that are excitatory on the direct pathway and inhibitory on the indirect pathway.

=== Subthalamic nucleus ===
The first intracellular electrical recordings of subthalamic neurons were performed using sharp electrodes in a rat slice preparation. In these recordings three key observations were made, all three of which have dominated subsequent reports of subthalamic firing properties. The first observation was that, in the absence of current injection or synaptic stimulation, the majority of cells were spontaneously firing. The second observation is that these cells are capable of transiently firing at very high frequencies. The third observation concerns non-linear behaviors when cells are transiently depolarized after being hyperpolarized below –65mV. They are then able to engage voltage-gated calcium and sodium currents to fire bursts of action potentials.

Several recent studies have focused on the autonomous pacemaking ability of subthalamic neurons. These cells are often referred to as "fast-spiking pacemakers", since they can generate spontaneous action potentials at rates of 80 to 90 Hz in primates.

Oscillatory and synchronous activity is likely to be a typical pattern of discharge in subthalamic neurons recorded from patients and animal models characterized by the loss of dopaminergic cells in the substantia nigra pars compacta, which is the principal pathology that underlies Parkinson's disease.

=== Lateropallido-subthalamic system ===
Strong reciprocal connections link the subthalamic nucleus and the external segment of the globus pallidus. Both are fast-spiking pacemakers. Together, they are thought to constitute the "central pacemaker of the basal ganglia" with synchronous bursts.

The connection of the lateral pallidum with the subthalamic nucleus is also the one in the basal ganglia system where the reduction between emitter/receiving elements is likely the strongest. In terms of volume, in humans, the lateral pallidum measures 808 mm^{3}, the subthalamic nucleus only 158 mm^{3}. This translated in numbers of neurons represents a strong compression with loss of map precision.

Some axons from the lateral pallidum go to the striatum. The activity of the medial pallidum is influenced by afferences from the lateral pallidum and from the subthalamic nucleus. The same for the substantia nigra pars reticulata. The subthalamic nucleus sends axons to another regulator: the pedunculo-pontine complex (id).

The lateropallido-subthalamic system is thought to play a key role in the generation of the patterns of activity seen in Parkinson's disease.

== Pathophysiology ==
Lesioning the STN leads to alleviation of motor symptoms such as akinesia, rigidity, and tremor in Parkinson disease. This was first shown in the MPTP primate model in a paper by Bergman and colleagues. This inspired Benazzouz and colleagues to probe deep brain stimulation of the nucleus, which was known to exert similar effects as ablative lesions. Soon after, the team of Alim Louis Benabid showed that deep brain stimulation of the nucleus leads to symptom relief in human patients with Parkinson disease, as well, which led to the establishment of the currently FDA approved and widely applied form of deep brain stimulation. The first to be stimulated are the terminal arborisations of afferent axons, which modify the activity of subthalamic neurons. However, it has been shown in thalamic slices from mice, that the stimulus also causes nearby astrocytes to release adenosine triphosphate (ATP), a precursor to adenosine (through a catabolic process). In turn, adenosine A1 receptor activation depresses excitatory transmission in the thalamus, thus mimicking ablation of the subthalamic nucleus.

Before the Bergman paper, the stereotactic field avoided lesioning the nucleus, since it was known that unilateral destruction or disruption of the subthalamic nucleus — which may result from naturally occurring strokes — may lead to hemiballismus. While this remains generally true, iatrogenic lesioning of the STN has been carried out numerous times and has recently gained new wind with the advent of MR guided focused ultrasound, which has also been probed for subthalamic nucleotomies to treat Parkinson disease. A team around Michael Fox could recently show that, while some lesions that led to hemiballism were indeed in and around the STN, the majority of reported cases were in other regions of the brain.

As one of the STN's suspected functions is in impulse control, dysfunction in this region has been implicated in obsessive–compulsive disorder. Application of high frequency pulses by deep brain stimulation has shown some promise in correcting severe impulsive behavior and has been FDA approved for treatment resistant cases with the disorder.

== Function ==
The function of the STN is not fully understood but it is believed that, as a component of the basal ganglia, it plays a part in the so-called "hyperdirect" and "indirect" pathways of motor control, as opposed to the direct pathway which bypasses the STN on its way from the Striatum to the internal pallidum. STN dysfunction has been implicated in motor symptoms such as rigidity, bradykinesia and tremor, behavioral features such as stopping of ongoing movements or impulsivity in individuals presented with two equally rewarding stimuli.

The physiological role of the STN has been for long hidden by its pathological role. But lately, the research on the physiology of the STN led to the discovery that the STN is required to achieve intended movement, including locomotion, balance and motor coordination. It is involved in stopping or interrupting on-going motor tasks. Moreover, STN excitation was generally correlated with significant reduction in locomotor activity, while in contrast, STN inhibition enhanced locomotion.

== History ==
The STN was first described by Jules Bernard Luys in 1865.

== Additional images ==
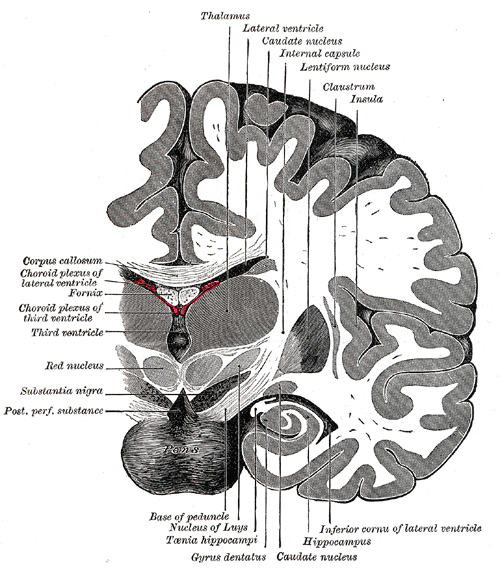
Coronal section of brain immediately in front of pons. Subthalamic nucleus labeled as "Nucleus of Luys".

== See also ==
- Primate basal ganglia
- Mesencephalic locomotor region
