= Internal globus pallidus =

Brain component in the basal ganglia

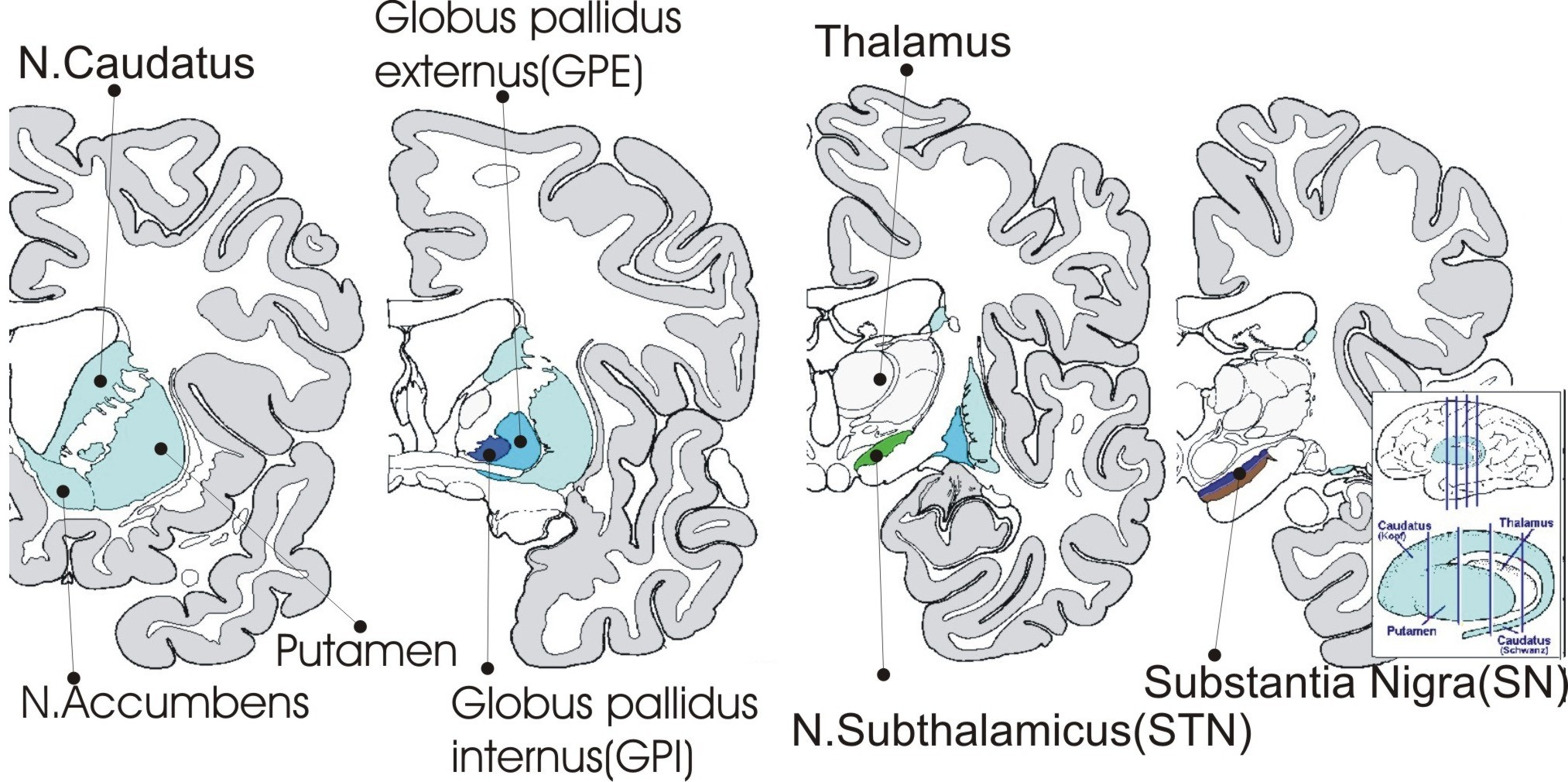
- Internal globus pallidus (GPi) is seen in the 2nd image from the left

Details
- Part of: Globus pallidus

Identifiers
- Latin: globus pallidus internus, globus pallidus medialis
- Acronym: GPi
- NeuroNames: 233
- NeuroLex ID: birnlex_1555
- TA98: A14.1.09.511
- TA2: 5572
- FMA: 61840

The internal globus pallidus (GPi or medial globus pallidus) is one of the two subcortical nuclei that provides inhibitory output in the basal ganglia, the other being the substantia nigra pars reticulata. Together with the external globus pallidus (GPe), it makes up one of the two segments of the globus pallidus, a structure that can decay with certain neurodegenerative disorders and is a target for medical and neurosurgical therapies. The GPi, along with the substantia nigra pars reticulata, comprise the primary output of the basal ganglia, with its outgoing GABAergic neurons having an inhibitory function in the thalamus, the centromedian complex and the pedunculopontine complex.

== Anatomy ==
The efferent bundle is constituted first of the ansa and lenticular fasciculus, then crosses the internal capsule within and in parallel to the Edinger's comb system then arrives at the laterosuperior corner of the subthalamic nucleus and constitutes the field H_{2} of Forel, then H, and suddenly changes its direction to form field H_{1} that goes to the inferior part of the thalamus. The distribution of axonal islands is widespread in the lateral region of the thalamus. The innervation of the central region is done by collaterals.

The GPi has outgoing GABAergic neurons that connect to the ventral anterior nucleus (VA) and the ventral lateral nucleus (VL) in the dorsal thalamus, to the centromedian complex, and to the pedunculopontine complex.

== Function ==
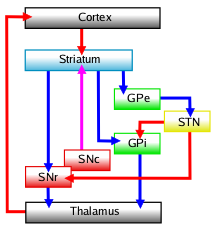
Direct and indirect striatopallidal pathways: Glutamatergic pathways are red, dopaminergic are magenta and GABAergic pathways are blue. STN: Subthalamic Nucleus SNr: Substantia Nigra pars reticulata SNc: Substantia Nigra pars compacta GPe: External globus pallidus

The GPi acts to tonically inhibit the ventral lateral nucleus and ventral anterior nucleus of the thalamus. As these two nuclei are needed for movement planning, this inhibition restricts movement initiation and prevents unwanted movements.

=== Direct pathway ===
The GPi receives inhibitory GABAergic signals from the striatum by way of striatopallidal fibres, when a movement requirement is signaled from the cerebral cortex. As the GPi is one of the direct output centers of the basal ganglia, this causes disinhibition of the thalamus, increasing overall ease of initiating and maintaining movement. As this pathway only contains one synapse (from the striatum to the internal globus pallidus), it is known as the direct pathway.

The direct pathway is modulated by stimulation of the GPi by the external globus pallidus and subthalamic nucleus, via the indirect pathway.

== Neurodegenerative disorders ==
Dysfunction of the internal globus pallidus has been correlated to Parkinson's disease, Tourette syndrome, and tardive dyskinesia.

The internal globus pallidus is the target of deep brain stimulation (DBS) for these diseases. Deep brain stimulation sends regulated electrical pulses to the target. In patients with tardive dyskinesia treated with DBS, most people reported more than a 50% improvement in symptoms. Tourette syndrome patients have also benefited from this treatment, showing over 50% improvement in tic severity (compulsive disabling motor tics are symptoms of Tourette patients). The GPi is also considered a "highly effective target for neuromodulation" when using deep brain stimulation on Parkinson's disease patients. There is seen to be only some involvement in Huntington's disease with mostly the external globus pallidus being affected.

== Animals ==
In rodents its homologue is known as the entopeduncular nucleus.
