= Cerebellothalamic tract =

The cerebellothalamic tract or the tractus cerebellothalamicus, is part of the superior cerebellar peduncle. It originates in the cerebellar nuclei, crosses completely in the decussation of the superior cerebellar peduncle, bypasses the red nucleus, and terminates in posterior division of ventral lateral nucleus of thalamus. The ventrolateral nucleus has different divisions and distinct connections, mostly with frontal and parietal lobes. The primary motor cortex and premotor cortex get information from the ventrolateral nucleus projections originating in the interposed nucleus and dentate nuclei. Other dentate nucleus projections via thalamic pathway transmit information to prefrontal cortex and posterior parietal cortex. The cerebellum sends thalamocortical projections and in addition may also send connections from the thalamus to association areas serving cognitive and affective functions.

It is mostly separated from the pallidothalamic tracts.

It can play a role in mediating symptoms in hereditary dystonia.

The term "cerebellothalamocortical pathway" is used to indicate termination in the cerebral cortex.

== Function ==
The cerebellothalamic tract transmits information from the cerebellum to the thalamus via neural impulses for the sensory systems.

Motor adaptation is primarily a function of the cerebellothalamic fiber pathway. The cerebellum oversees modification of routine motor programs in response to changes in the environment (e.g. walking uphill versus walking on a flat surface). It is experimentally shown that prolonged motor adaptation, such as walking over a period of weeks while wearing an ankle cast, is accompanied by long-term potentiation of cerebellothalamic synapses, thereby facilitating the influence of the cerebellum on the motor cortex.

== Clinical significance ==
Lesions in cerebrocerebellum, which receives input exclusively from the cerebral cortex and projects its output to premotor and motor cortices, result in impairments in highly skilled sequences of learned movements, for instance, playing a musical instrument.

Lesions may also result in problems with planning movements and ipsilateral incoordination, especially of the upper limb and to faulty phonation and articulation.

Pathological interaction between cerebellothalamic tract and basal ganglia may be the explanation for the resting tremor in Parkinson's disease.

== See also ==
- Dentatothalamic tract
