= Striatopallidal fibres =

Structure of the basal ganglia

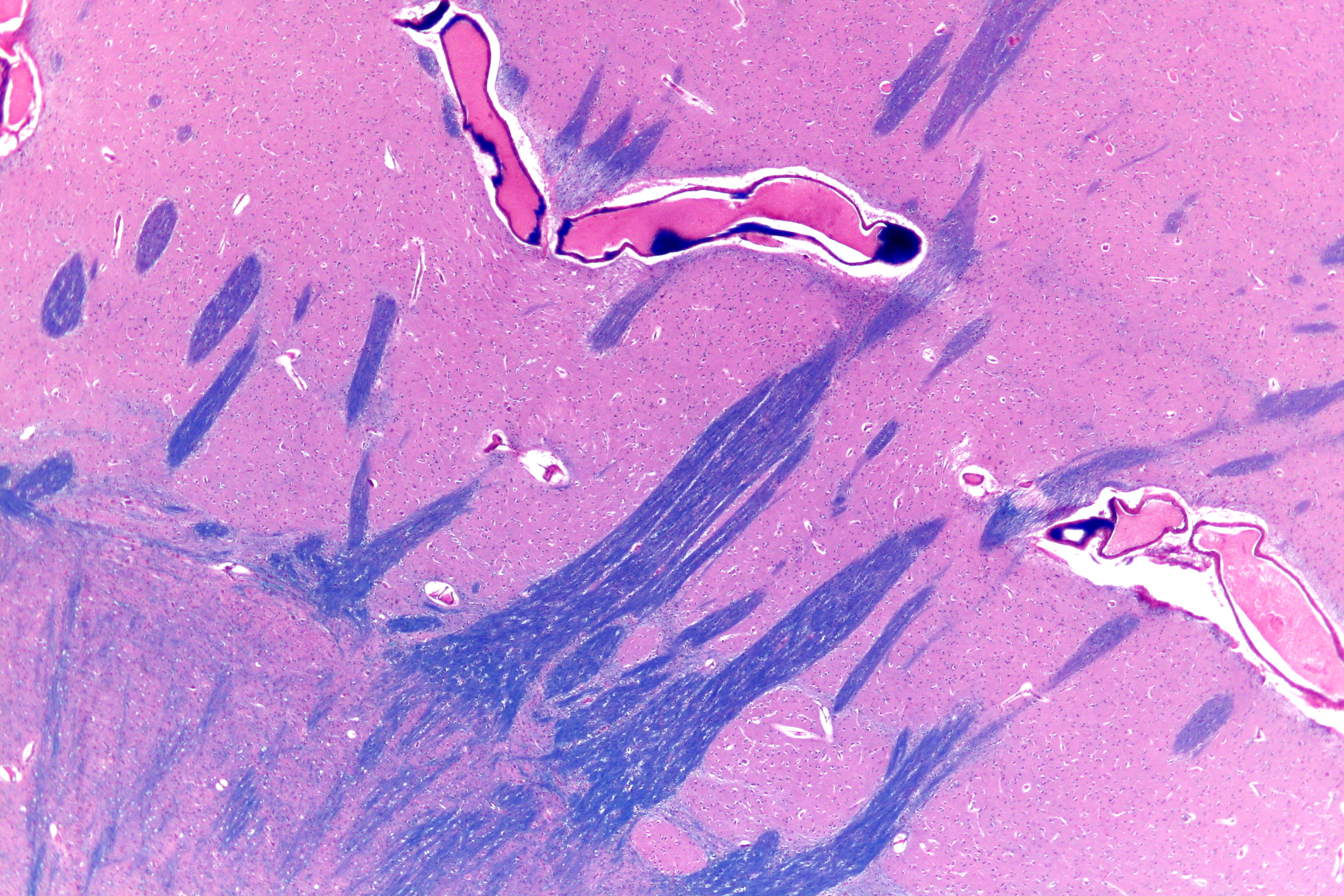
Micrograph of the putamen (top-right of image) and external globus pallidus (bottom-left of image) showing the striatopallidal fibres (blue, diagonal, linear structures). H&E-LFB stain.

The striatopallidal fibres, also Wilson's pencils, pencil fibres of Wilson, and pencils of Wilson, are prominent myelinated fibres that connect the striatum to the globus pallidus.

Their distinctive appearance allows the putamen to be identified on light microscopy.

== See also ==
- Lentiform nucleus
