= External globus pallidus =

Part of the globus pallidus

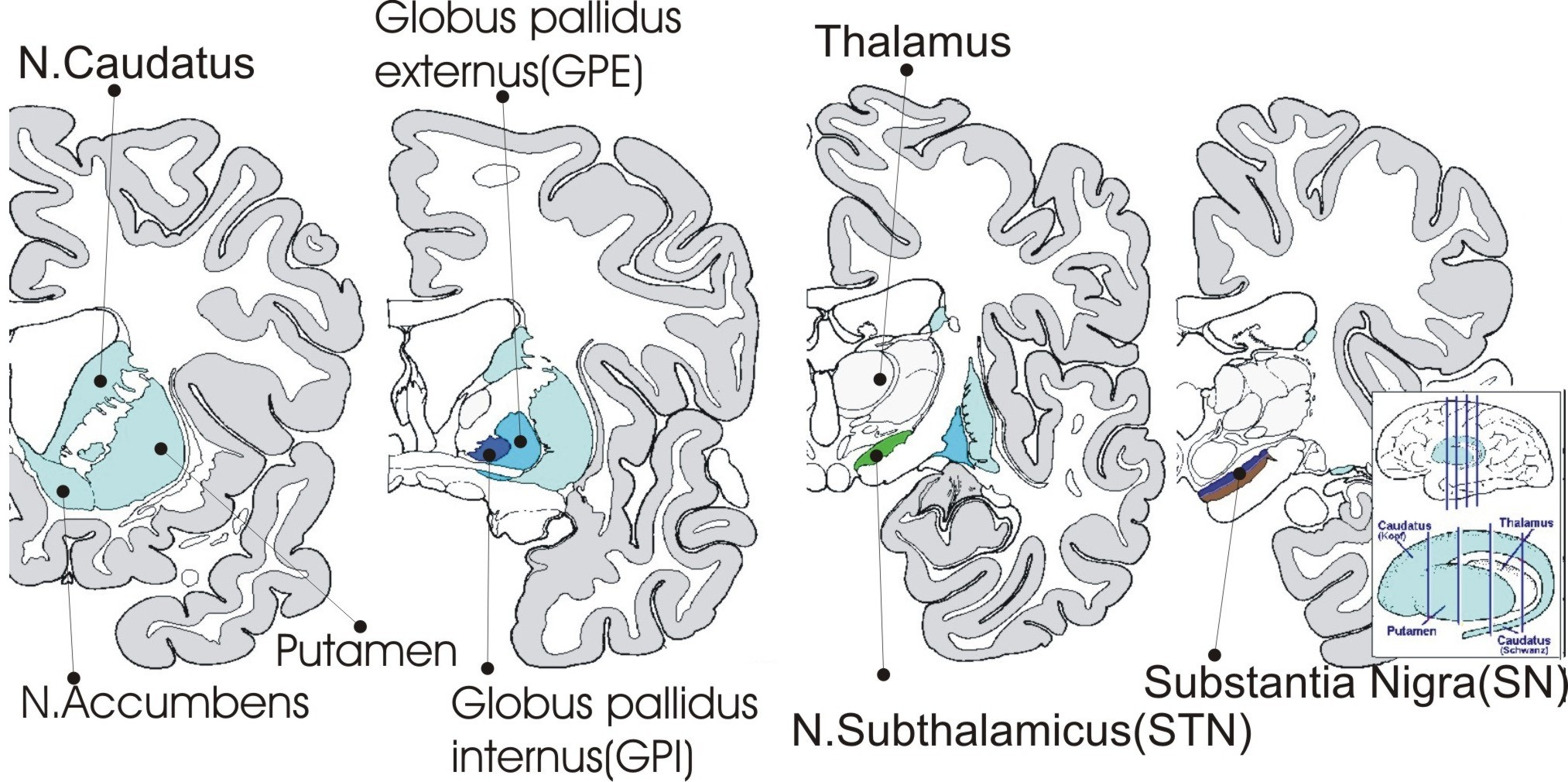
- External globus pallidus (GPe) seen in 2nd image from the left

Details
- Part of: Globus pallidus

Identifiers
- Latin: globus pallidus externus, globus pallidus lateralis
- Acronym(s): GPe
- NeuroNames: 232
- NeuroLex ID: birnlex_1610
- TA98: A14.1.09.509
- TA2: 5570
- FMA: 61839

The external globus pallidus (GPe or lateral globus pallidus) combines with the internal globus pallidus (GPi) to form the globus pallidus, an anatomical subset of the basal ganglia. Globus pallidus means "pale globe" in Latin, indicating its appearance. The external globus pallidus is the segment of the globus pallidus that is relatively further (lateral) from the midline of the brain.

The GPe is predominantly composed of inhibitory GABAergic neurons that project axons to the subthalamic nucleus (in the diencephalon), the striatum, internal globus pallidus (GPi) and substantia nigra pars reticulata.

The GPe is particular in comparison to the other elements of the set by the fact that it does not work as an output base of the basal ganglia (not sending axons to the thalamus) but as the main regulator of the basal ganglia system. It is sometimes used as a target for deep brain stimulation as a treatment for Parkinson's disease.

== Function ==
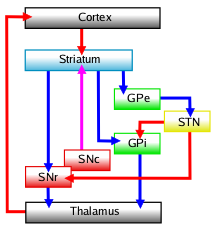
Direct and indirect striatopallidal pathways: Glutamatergic pathways are red, dopaminergic are magenta and GABAergic pathways are blue. STN: Subthalamic Nucleus SNr: Substantia Nigra pars reticulata SNc: Substantia Nigra pars compacta GPi: Medial globus pallidus

=== Indirect pathway ===
The basal ganglia functions to tonically inhibit movement, mainly in the absence of motor cortex command, via GABAergic inhibition of the ventral lateral nucleus and ventral anterior nucleus of the thalamus, as well as the superior colliculus and mesopontine tegmentum of the brain stem. When movement is required, the cerebral cortex sends commands to the striatum, which directly inhibits the medial globus pallidus and substantia nigra pars reticulata, decreasing thalamus and brainstem inhibition. As the pathway from the striatum to the medial globus pallidus is monosynaptic (containing one synapse), it is called the direct pathway.

The indirect pathway, which contains the GPe and the subthalamic nucleus, functions to modulate the effects of the direct pathway. The GPe acts as an inhibitory "control device", adjusting subthalamic nucleus neuronal activity via GABAergic output.

When movement adjustment is required, striatal inhibitory GABAergic axons are sent to the GPe, decreasing inhibition of the subthalamic nucleus. The subthalamic nucleus' glutamatergic neurons then stimulate the GPi and substantia nigra pars reticulata.

This multisynaptic indirect striatopallidal pathway allows for regulated excitatory input from the subthalamic nucleus to the GPi and substantia nigra pars reticulata. This combines with direct pathway inhibition in the GPi, allowing for fine tuned basal ganglia output, and more controlled movement.

== Related pathology ==
Lateral globus pallidus dysfunction has been observed in the following conditions:

- Parkinson's disease
- Huntington's disease
- Dystonia
