= Pedunculopontine nucleus =

Collection of neurons in the brainstem

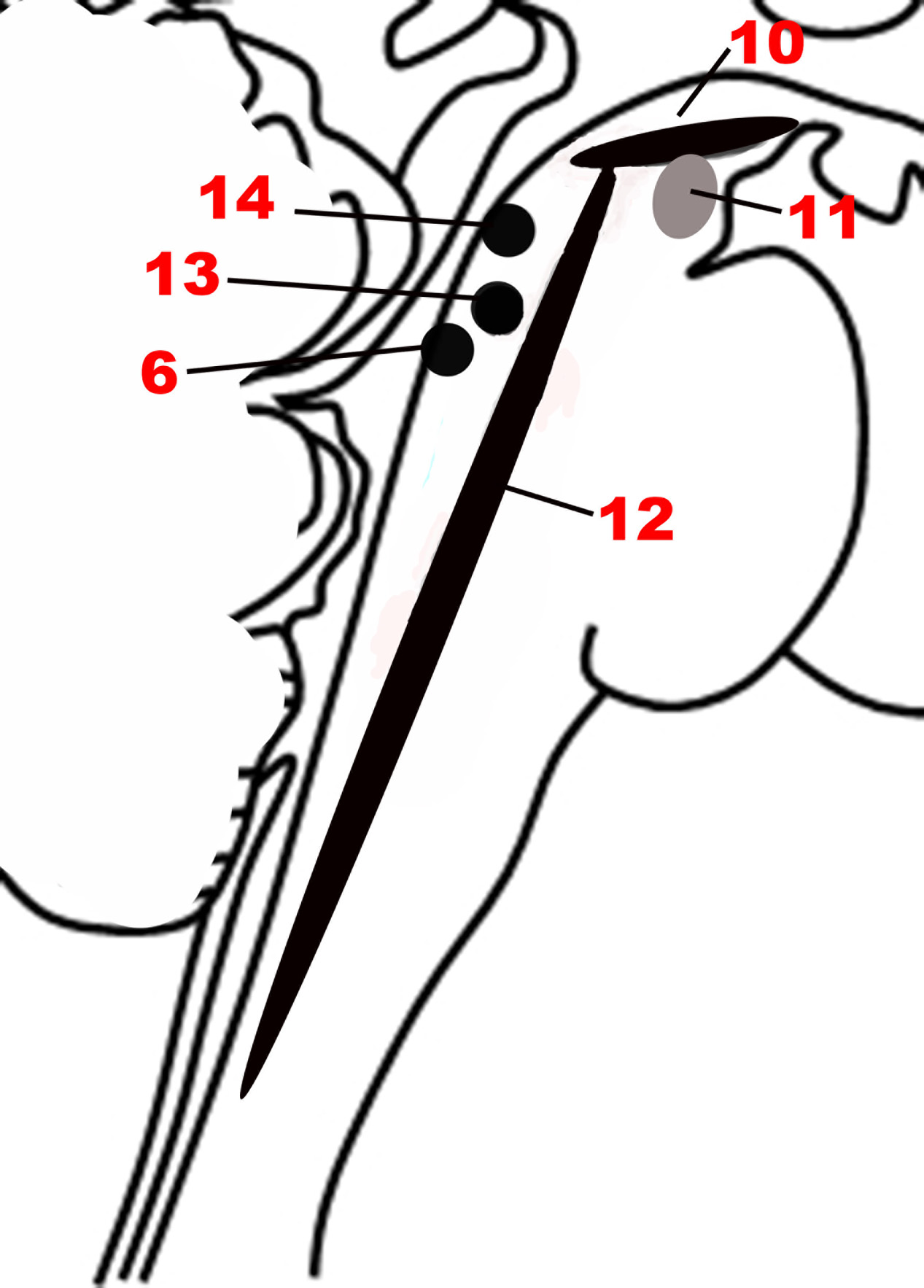
- Pedunculopontine nucleus at number 13

Details

Identifiers
- Latin: nucleus tegmentalis pedunculopontinus
- MeSH: D045042
- NeuroNames: 504
- NeuroLex ID: birnlex_1437
- TA98: A14.1.06.336
- TA2: 5895
- FMA: 72429

The pedunculopontine nucleus (PPN) or pedunculopontine tegmental nucleus (PPT or PPTg) is a collection of neurons located in the upper pons in the brainstem. It is involved in voluntary movements, arousal, and provides sensory feedback to the cerebral cortex and one of the main components of the ascending reticular activating system. It is a potential target for deep brain stimulation treatment for Parkinson's disease. It was first described in 1909 by Louis Jacobsohn-Lask, a German neuroanatomist.

== Structure and projections ==
The pedunculopontine nucleus lies below the red nucleus, caudal to the substantia nigra and adjacent to the superior cerebellar peduncle. It has two divisions of subnuclei; the pars compacta, containing mainly cholinergic neurons, and the pars dissipata, containing mainly glutamatergic neurons and some non-cholinergic neurons.

Its neurons project axons to a wide range of areas in the brain, particularly parts of the basal ganglia such as the subthalamic nucleus, substantia nigra pars compacta, and globus pallidus internus. It also sends them to targets in the thalamus, cerebellum, basal forebrain, and lower brainstem, and in the cerebral cortex, the supplementary motor area and somatosensory and motor cortices.

It receives inputs from many areas of the brain. It both projects to and receives input from most parts of the basal ganglia, with the exception of the substantia nigra pars compacta (which it projects to but does not receive input from), and the substantia nigra pars reticulata (which it receives input from but does not project to).

== Functions ==
The pedunculopontine nucleus is involved in many functions, including arousal, attention, learning, reward, and voluntary limb movements and locomotion. While once thought important to the initiation of movement, recent research suggests a role in providing sensory feedback to the cerebral cortex. It is also implicated in the generation and maintenance of REM sleep.

Recent research has discovered that the pedunculopontine nucleus is involved in the planning of movement, and that different networks of neurons in the pedunculopontine nucleus are switched on during real and imagined movement.

== Parkinson's disease ==
Research is being done on whether deep brain stimulation of the pedunculopontine nucleus might be used to improve the gait and postural difficulties found in Parkinson's disease. Clinical trials show improvement of balance and postural reactions when the pedunculopontine nucleus is electrically stimulated.
