= Lenticular fasciculus =

Tract of the nervous system

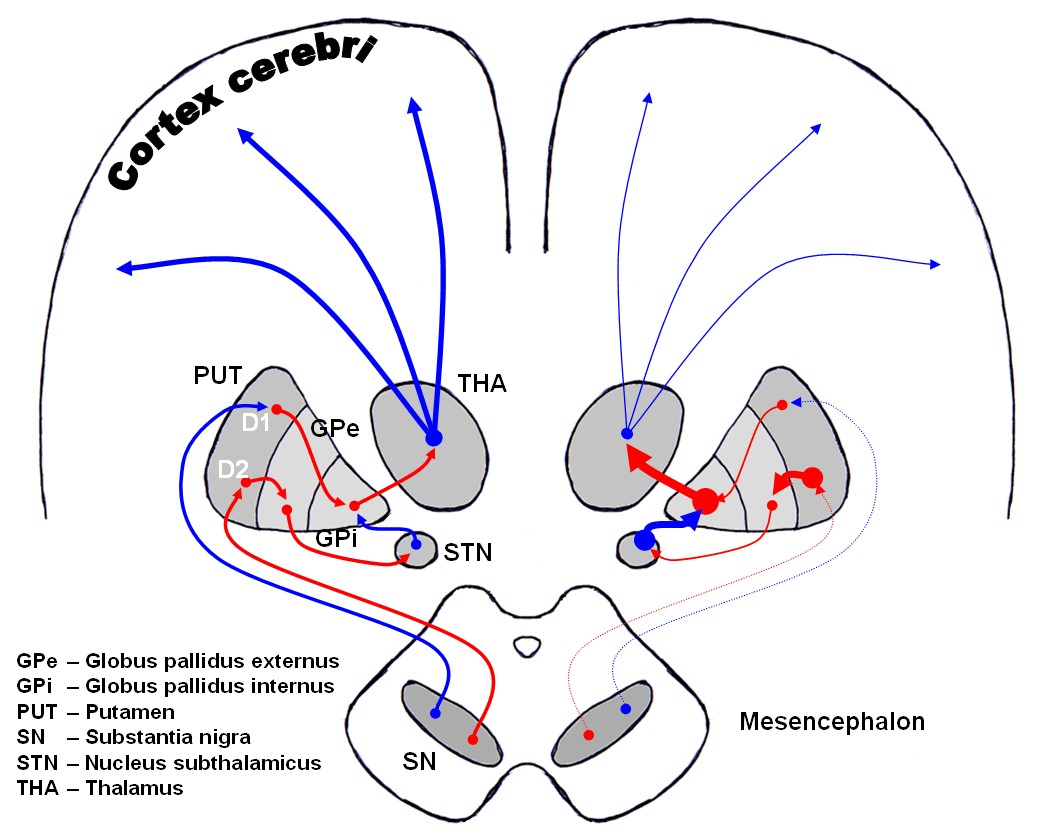
- The image shows dopaminergic pathways of the human brain in normal condition (left) and Parkinsons Disease (right). Red Arrows indicate suppression of the target, blue arrows indicate stimulation of target structure. (Lenticular fasciculus visible but not labeled, as red line from GPi to THA.)

Details

Identifiers
- Latin: fasciculus lenticularis
- NeuroNames: 441
- NeuroLex ID: nlx_66287
- TA98: A14.1.08.664; A14.1.09.521
- TA2: 5752
- FMA: 61976

The lenticular fasciculus is a tract connecting the globus pallidus (internus) to the thalamus and is a part of the thalamic fasciculus. It is synonymous with field H_{2} of Forel. The thalamic fasciculus (composed of both the lenticular fasciculus and ansa lenticularis) runs to the thalamus. It is part of a pathway connecting the globus pallidus and the thalamus.

Lesions in this area can result in dyskinesias such as chorea-like movements.
