= Ansa lenticularis =

Superior layer of the substantia innominata of the brain

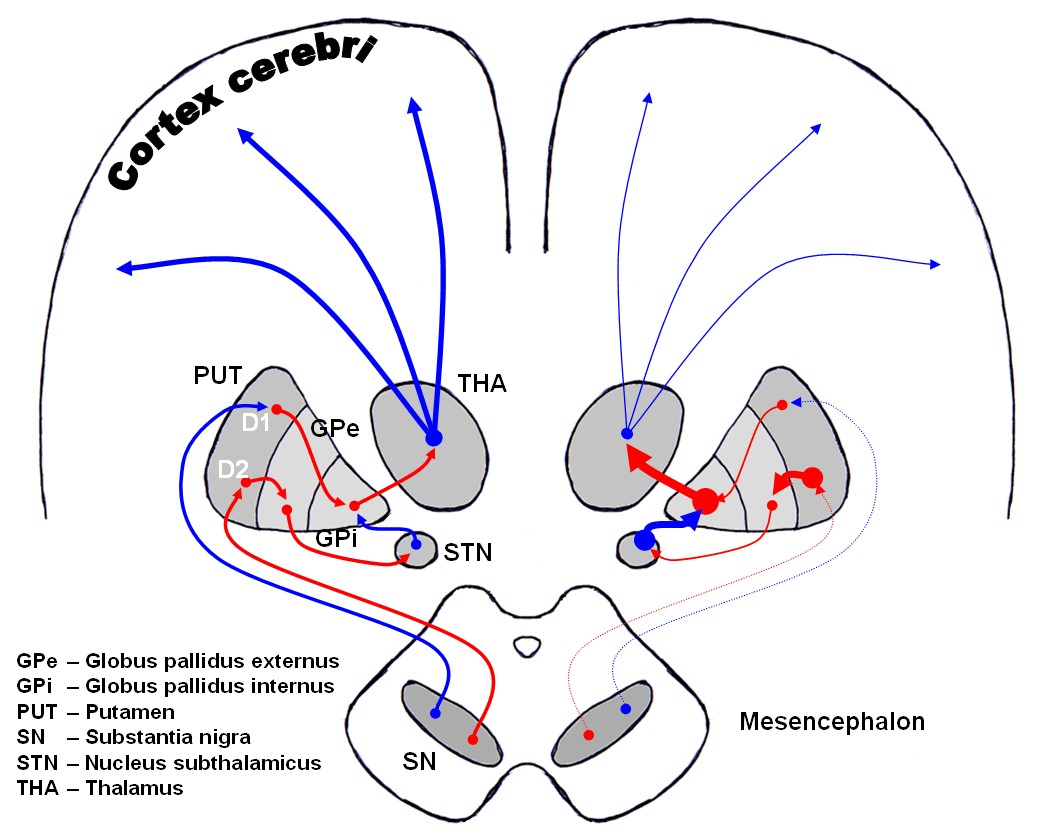
- The image shows dopaminergic pathways of the human brain in normal condition (left) and Parkinsons Disease (right). Red Arrows indicate suppression of the target, blue arrows indicate stimulation of target structure. (Ansa lenticularis visible but not labeled, as red line from GPi to THA.)

Details

Identifiers
- Latin: Ansa lentiformis
- NeuroNames: 444
- NeuroLex ID: nlx_87326
- TA98: A14.1.08.663; A14.1.09.520; A14.1.08.665
- TA2: 5751
- FMA: 62070

The ansa lenticularis (ansa lentiformis in older texts) is a part of the brain, making up the superior layer of the substantia innominata. Its fibers, derived from the medullary lamina of the lentiform nucleus, pass medially to end in the thalamus and subthalamic region, while others are said to end in the tegmentum and red nucleus. It is classified by NeuroNames as part of the subthalamus.
