= Akinetopsia =

Loss of visual motion perception

Akinetopsia (from Greek akinesia 'absence of movement' and opsis 'seeing'), also known as cerebral akinetopsia or motion blindness, is an extremely rare neuropsychological disorder, having only been documented in a handful of medical cases, in which a patient cannot perceive motion in their visual field, despite being able to see stationary objects without issue. The syndrome is the result of damage to visual area V5, whose cells are specialized to detect directional visual motion. There are varying degrees of akinetopsia: from seeing motion as frames of a cinema reel to an inability to discriminate any motion. There is currently no effective treatment or cure for akinetopsia.

== Signs and symptoms ==
Akinetopsia can manifest in a spectrum of severity and some cases may be episodic or temporary. It may range from "inconspicuous akinetopsia" to "gross akinetopsia", based on symptom severity and the amount the akinetopsia affects the patient's quality of life.

=== Inconspicuous akinetopsia ===
Inconspicuous akinetopsia is often described by seeing motion as a cinema reel or a multiple exposure photograph. This is the most common kind of akinetopsia and many patients consider the stroboscopic vision as a nuisance. The akinetopsia often occurs with visual trailing (palinopsia), with afterimages being left at each frame of the motion. It is caused by prescription drugs, hallucinogen persisting perception disorder (HPPD), and persistent aura without infarction. The pathophysiology of akinetopsia palinopsia is not known, but it has been hypothesized to be due to inappropriate activation of physiological motion suppression mechanisms which are normally used to maintain visual stability during eye movements (e.g. saccadic suppression).

=== Gross akinetopsia ===
Gross akinetopsia is an extremely rare condition. Patients have profound motion blindness and struggle in performing the activities of daily living. Instead of seeing vision as a cinema reel, these patients have trouble perceiving gross motion. Most of what is known about this extremely rare condition was learned through the case study of one patient, LM. LM described pouring a cup of tea or coffee difficult "because the fluid appeared to be frozen, like a glacier". She did not know when to stop pouring, because she could not perceive the movement of the fluid rising. LM and other patients have also complained of having trouble following conversations, because lip movements and changing facial expressions were missed. LM stated she felt insecure when more than two people were walking around in a room: "people were suddenly here or there but I have not seen them moving". Movement is inferred by comparing the change in position of an object or person. LM and others have described crossing the street and driving cars to also be of great difficulty. The patient was still able to perceive movement of auditory and tactile stimuli.

A change in brain structure (typically lesions) disturbs the psychological process of understanding sensory information, in this case visual information. Disturbance of only visual motion is possible due to the anatomical separation of visual motion processing from other functions. Like akinetopsia, perception of color can also be selectively disturbed as in achromatopsia. There is an inability to see motion despite normal spatial acuity, flicker detection, stereo and color vision. Other intact functions include visual space perception and visual identification of shapes, objects, and faces. Besides simple perception, akinetopsia also disturbs visuomotor tasks, such as reaching for objects and catching objects. When doing tasks, feedback of one's own motion appears to be important.

== Causes ==
=== Brain lesions ===
Akinetopsia may be an acquired deficit from lesions in the posterior side of the visual cortex. Lesions more often cause gross akinetopsia. The neurons of the middle temporal cortex respond to moving stimuli and hence the middle temporal cortex is the motion-processing area of the cerebral cortex. In the case of LM, the brain lesion was bilateral and symmetrical, and at the same time small enough not to affect other visual functions. Some unilateral lesions have been reported to impair motion perception as well. Akinetopsia through lesions is rare, because damage to the occipital lobe usually disturbs more than one visual function. Akinetopsia has also been reported as a result of traumatic brain injury.

=== Transcranial magnetic stimulation ===
Inconspicuous akinetopsia can be selectively and temporarily induced using transcranial magnetic stimulation (TMS) of area V5 of the visual cortex in healthy subjects. It is performed on a 1 cm² surface of the head, corresponding in position to area V5. With an 800-microsecond TMS pulse and a 28 ms stimulus at 11 degrees per second, V5 is incapacitated for about 20–30 ms. It is effective between −20 ms and +10 ms before and after onset of a moving visual stimulus. Inactivating V1 with TMS could induce some degree of akinetopsia 60–70 ms after the onset of the visual stimulus. TMS of V1 is not nearly as effective in inducing akinetopsia as TMS of V5.

=== Alzheimer's disease ===
Besides memory problems, Alzheimer's patients may have varying degrees of akinetopsia. This could contribute to their marked disorientation. While Pelak and Hoyt have recorded an Alzheimer's case study, there has not been much research done on the subject yet.

=== Antidepressants ===
Inconspicuous akinetopsia can be triggered by high doses of certain antidepressants with vision returning to normal once the dosage is reduced.

== Areas of visual perception ==
Two relevant visual areas for motion processing are V5 and V1. These areas are separated by their function in vision. A functional area is a set of neurons with common selectivity and stimulation of this area, specifically behavioral influences. There have been over 30 specialized processing areas found in the visual cortex.

=== V5 ===
V5, also known as visual area MT (middle temporal), is located laterally and ventrally in the temporal lobe, near the intersection of the ascending limb of the inferior temporal sulcus and the lateral occipital sulcus. All of the neurons in V5 are motion selective, and most are directionally selective. Evidence of functional specialization of V5 was first found in primates. Patients with akinetopsia tend to have unilateral or bi-lateral damage to the V5.

=== V1 ===
V1, also known as the primary visual cortex, is located in Brodmann area 17. V1 is known for its pre-processing capabilities of visual information; however, it is no longer considered the only perceptually effective gateway to the cortex. Motion information can reach V5 without passing through V1 and a return input from V5 to V1 is not required for seeing simple visual motion. Motion-related signals arrive at V1 (60–70 ms) and V5 (< 30 ms) at different times, with V5 acting independently of V1. Patients with blindsight have damage to V1, but because V5 is intact, they can still sense motion. Inactivating V1 limits motion vision, but does not stop it completely.

=== Ventral and dorsal streams ===
Another thought on visual brain organization is the theory of streams for spatial vision, the ventral stream for perception and the dorsal stream for action. Since LM has impairment in both perception and action (such as grasping and catching actions), it has been suggested that V5 provides input to both perception and action processing streams.

== Case studies ==
=== Potzl and Redlich's patient ===
In 1911, Potzl and Redlich reported a 58-year-old female patient with bilateral damage to her posterior brain. She described motion as if the object remained stationary but appeared at different successive positions. Additionally, she also lost a significant amount of her visual field and had anomic aphasia.

=== Goldstein and Gelb's patient ===
In 1918, Goldstein and Gelb reported a 24-year-old male who suffered a gunshot wound in the posterior brain. The patient reported no impression of movement. He could state the new position of the object (left, right, up, down), but saw "nothing in between". While Goldestein and Gelb believed the patient had damaged the lateral and medial parts of the left occipital lobe, it was later indicated that both occipital lobes were probably affected, due to the bilateral, concentric loss of his visual field. He lost his visual field beyond a 30-degree eccentricity and could not identify visual objects by their proper names.

=== "LM" ===
Most of what is known about akinetopsia was learned from LM, a 43-year-old female admitted into the hospital in October 1978 complaining of headache and vertigo. LM was diagnosed with thrombosis of the superior sagittal sinus which resulted in bilateral, symmetrical lesions posterior of the visual cortex. These lesions were verified by PET and MRI in 1994. LM had minimal motion perception that was preserved as perhaps a function of V1, as a function of a "higher" order visual cortical area, or some functional sparing of V5.

LM found no effective treatment, so she learned to avoid conditions with multiple visual motion stimuli, i.e. by not looking at or fixating them. She developed very efficient coping strategies to do this and nevertheless lived her life. In addition, she estimated the distance of moving vehicles by means of sound detection in order to continue to cross the street.

LM was tested in three areas against a 24-year-old female subject with normal vision:

==== Visual functions other than movement vision ====
LM had no evidence of a color discrimination deficit in either center or periphery of visual fields. Her recognition time for visual objects and words was slightly higher than the control, but not statistically significant. There was no restriction in her visual field and no scotoma.

==== Disturbance of movement vision ====
LM's impression of movement depended on the direction of the movement (horizontal versus vertical), the velocity, and whether she fixated in the center of the motion path or tracked the object with her eyes. Circular light targets were used as stimuli.

In studies, LM reported some impression of horizontal movement at a speed of 14 degrees of her predetermined visual field per second (deg/s) while fixating in the middle of the motion path, with difficulty seeing motion both below and above this velocity. When allowed to track the moving spot, she had some horizontal movement vision up to 18 deg/s. For vertical movement, the patient could only see motion below 10 deg/s fixated or 13 deg/s when tracking the target. The patient described her perceptual experience for stimulus velocities higher than 18 and 13 deg/s, respectively as "one light spot left or right" or "one light spot up or down" and "sometimes at successive positions in between", but never as motion.

==== Motion in depth ====
To determine perception of motion in depth, studies were done in which the experimenter moved a black painted wooden cube on a tabletop either towards the patient or away in line of sight. After 20 trials at 3 or 6 deg/s, the patient had no clear impression of movement. However she knew the object had changed in position, she knew the size of the cube, and she could correctly judge the distance of the cube in relation to other nearby objects.

==== Inner and outer visual fields ====
Detection of movement in the inner and outer visual fields was tested. Within her inner visual field, LM could detect some motion, with horizontal motion more easily distinguished than vertical motion. In her peripheral visual field, the patient was never able to detect any direction of movement. LM's ability to judge velocities was also tested. LM underestimated velocities over 12 deg/s.

==== Motion aftereffect and phi phenomenon ====
Motion aftereffect of vertical stripes moving in a horizontal direction and a rotating spiral were tested. She was able to detect motion in both patterns, but reported motion aftereffect in only 3 of the 10 trials for the stripes, and no effect for the rotating spiral. She also never reported any impression of motion in depth of the spiral. The phi phenomenon consists of two circular spots of light appear alternating, so that it appears that the spot moves from one location to the other. Under no combination of conditions did the patient report any apparent movement. She always reported two independent light spots.

==== Visually guided pursuit eye and finger movements ====
LM was to follow the path of a wire mounted onto a board with her right index finger. The test was performed under purely tactile (blindfolded), purely visual (glass over the board), or tactile-visual condition. The patient performed best in the purely tactile condition and very poorly in the visual condition. She did not benefit from the visual information in the tactile-visual condition either. The patient reported that the difficulty was between her finger and her eyes. She could not follow her finger with her eyes if she moved her finger too fast.

==== Additional experiments ====
In 1994, several other observations of LM's capabilities were made using a stimulus with a random distribution of light squares on a dark background that moved coherently. With this stimulus, LM could always determine the axis of motion (vertical, horizontal), but not always the direction. If a few static squares were added to the moving display, identification of direction fell to chance, but identification of the axis of motion was still accurate. If a few squares were moving opposite and orthogonal to the predominant direction, her performance on both direction and axis fell to chance. She was also unable to identify motion in oblique directions, such as 45, 135, 225, and 315 degrees, and always gave answers in cardinal directions, 0, 90, 180, and 270 degrees.

=== "TD" ===
In 2019, Heutink and colleagues described a 37-year old female patient (TD) with akinetopsia, who was admitted to Royal Dutch Visio, Centre of Expertise for blind and partially sighted people. TD suffered an ischaemic infarction of the occipitotemporal region in the right hemisphere and a smaller infarction in the left occipital hemisphere. MRI confirmed that the damaged brain areas contained area V5 in both hemispheres. TD experienced problems with perceiving visual motion and also reported that bright colours and sharp contrasts made her feel sick. TD also had problems perceiving objects that were more than ± 5 meters away from her. Although TD had some impairments of lower visual functions, these could not explain the problems she experienced with regard to motion perception. Neuropsychological assessment revealed no evidence of Balint's Syndrome, hemispatial neglect or visual extinction, prosopagnosia or object agnosia. There was some evidence for impaired spatial processing. On several behavioural tests, TD showed a specific and selective impairment of motion perception that was comparable to LM's performance.

TD's ability to determine the direction of movement was tested using a task in which small grey blocks all moved in the same direction with the same speed against a black background. The blocks could move in four directions: right to left, left to right, upward and downward. Speed of movement was varied from 2, 4.5, 9, 15 and 24 degrees per second. Speed and direction were varied randomly across trials. TD had perfect perception of motion direction at speed up to 9 degrees per second. When speed of targets was above 9 degrees per second, TD's performance dropped dramatically to 50% correct at a speed of 15 degrees per second and 0% correct at 24 degrees per second. When the blocks moved at 24 degrees per second, TD consistently reported the exact opposite direction of the actual movement.

=== Pelak and Hoyt's Alzheimer's patient ===
In 2000, a 70-year-old man presented with akinetopsia. He had stopped driving two years prior because he could no longer "see movement while driving". His wife noted that he could not judge the speed of another car or how far away it was. He had difficulty watching television with significant action or movement, such as sporting events or action-filled TV shows. He frequently commented to his wife that he could not "see anything going on". When objects began to move they would disappear. He could, however, watch the news, because no significant action occurred. In addition he had signs of Balint's syndrome (mild simultanagnosia, optic ataxia, and optic apraxia).

=== Pelak and Hoyt's TBI patient ===
In 2003, a 60-year-old man complained of the inability to perceive visual motion following a traumatic brain injury, two years prior, in which a large cedar light pole fell and struck his head. He gave examples of his difficulty as a hunter. He was unable to notice game, to track other hunters, or to see his dog coming towards him. Instead, these objects would appear in one location and then another, without any movement being seen between the two locations. He had difficulties driving and following a group conversation. He lost his place when vertically or horizontally scanning a written document and was unable to visualize three-dimensional images from two-dimensional blueprints.
