= Visual processing =

Cognitive ability to interpret visual information

Visual processing is the brain's ability to use and interpret visual information from the world. The process of converting light into a meaningful image is a complex process that is facilitated by numerous brain structures and higher-level cognitive processes.

On an anatomical level, light first enters the eye through the cornea, where the light is bent. After passing through the cornea, light passes through the pupil and then the lens of the eye, where it is bent to a greater degree and focused upon the retina. The retina is where a group of light-sensing cells called photoreceptors are located. There are two types of photoreceptors: rods and cones. Rods are sensitive to dim light, and cones are better able to transduce bright light. Photoreceptors connect to bipolar cells, which induce action potentials in retinal ganglion cells. These retinal ganglion cells form a bundle at the optic disc, which is a part of the optic nerve.

The two optic nerves from each eye meet at the optic chiasm, where nerve fibers from each nasal retina cross. This results in the right half of each eye's visual field being represented in the left hemisphere and the left half of each eye's visual fields being represented in the right hemisphere. The optic tract then diverges into two visual pathways, the geniculostriate pathway and the tectopulvinar pathway, which send visual information to the visual cortex of the occipital lobe for higher-level processing (Whishaw and Kolb, 2015).

== Top-down and bottom-up representations ==
The visual system is organized hierarchically, with anatomical areas that have specialized functions in visual processing. Low-level visual processing is concerned with determining different types of contrast among images projected onto the retina whereas high-level visual processing refers to the cognitive processes that integrate information from a variety of sources into the visual information that is represented in one's mind. Object processing, including tasks such as object recognition and location, is an example of higher-level visual processing. High-level visual processing depends on both top-down and bottom-up processes. Bottom-up processing refers to the visual system's ability to use the incoming visual information, flowing in a unidirectional path from the retina to higher cortical areas. Top-down processing refers to the use of prior knowledge and context to process visual information and change the information conveyed by neurons, altering the way they are tuned to a stimulus. All areas of the visual pathway except for the retina are able to be influenced by top-down processing.

There is a traditional view that visual processing follows a feedforward system where there is a one-way process by which light is sent from the retina to higher cortical areas; however, there is increasing evidence that visual pathways operate bidirectionally, with both feedforward and feedback mechanisms in place that transmit information to and from lower and higher cortical areas. Various studies have demonstrated this idea that visual processing relies on both feedforward and feedback systems (Jensen et al., 2015; Layher et al., 2014; Lee, 2002). Various studies that recorded from early visual neurons in macaque monkeys found evidence that early visual neurons are sensitive to features both within their receptive fields and the global context of a scene. Two other monkey studies used electrophysiology to find different frequencies that are associated with feedforward and feedback processing in monkeys (Orban, 2008; Schenden & Ganis, 2005). Studies with monkeys have also shown that neurons in higher-level visual areas are selective to certain stimuli. One study that used single-unit recordings in macaque monkeys found that neurons in the middle temporal visual area, also known as area MT or V5, were highly selective for both direction and speed (Maunsell & Van Essen, 1983).

== Disorders of higher-level visual processing ==
Various disorders are known to cause deficits in higher-level visual processing, including visual object agnosia, prosopagnosia, topographagnosia, alexia, achromatopsia, akinetopsia, Balint syndrome, and astereopsis. These deficits are caused by damage to brain structure implicated in either the ventral or dorsal visual stream (Barton 2011).

== Processing of face and place stimuli ==
Past models of visual processing have distinguished certain areas of the brain by the specific stimuli that they are most responsive to; for example, the parahippocampal place area (PPA) has been shown to have heightened activation when presented with buildings and place scenes (Epstein & Kanwisher, 1998), whereas the fusiform face area (FFA) responds mostly strongly to faces and face-like stimuli (Kanwisher et al., 1997).

=== Parahippocampal Place Area (PPA) ===
The parahippocampal place area (PPA) is located in the posterior parahippocampal gyrus, which itself is contained in the medial temporal lobe with proximity to the hippocampus. Its name comes from the increased neural response in the PPA when viewing places, like buildings, houses, and other structures, and when viewing environmental scenes, both indoors and outdoors (Epstein & Kanwisher, 1998). This is not to say that the PPA does not show activation when presented with other visual stimuli – when presented with familiar objects that are neither buildings nor faces, like chairs, there is also some activation within the PPA (Ishai et al., 2000). It does however appear that the PPA is associated with visual processing of buildings and places, as patients who have experienced damage to the parahippocampal area demonstrate topographic disorientation, in other words, are unable to navigate familiar and unfamiliar surroundings (Habib & Sirigu, 1987). Outside of visual processing, the parahippocampal gyrus is involved in both spatial memory and spatial navigation (Squire & Zola-Morgan, 1991).

=== Fusiform Face Area (FFA) ===
The fusiform face area is located within the inferior temporal cortex in the fusiform gyrus. Similar to the PPA, the FFA exhibits higher neural activation when visually processing faces more so than places or buildings (Kanwisher et al., 1997). However, the fusiform area also shows activation for other stimuli and can be trained to specialize in the visual processing of objects of expertise. Past studies have investigated the activation of the FFA in people with specialized visual training, like bird watchers or car experts who have adapted a visual skill in identifying traits of birds and cars respectively. It has been shown that these experts have developed FFA activation for their specific visual expertise. Other experiments have studied the ability to develop expertise in the FFA using 'greebles', a visual stimulus generated to have a few components that can be combined to make a series of different configurations, much like how a variety of slightly different facial features can be used to construct a unique face. Participants were trained on their ability to distinguish greebles by differing features and had activation in the FFA measured periodically through their learning – the results after training demonstrated that greeble activation in the FFA increased over time whereas FFA responses to faces actually decreased with increased greeble training. These results suggested three major findings in regards to FFA in visual processing: firstly, the FFA does not exclusively process faces; secondly, the FFA demonstrates activation for 'expert' visual tasks and can be trained over time to adapt to new visual stimuli; lastly, the FFA does not maintain constant levels of activation for all stimuli and instead seems to 'share' activation in such a way that the most frequently viewed stimuli receives the greatest activation in the FFA as seen in the greebles study (Gauthier et al., 2000).

=== Development of the FFA and PPA in the brain ===
Some research suggests that the development of the FFA and the PPA is due to the specialization of certain visual tasks and their relation to other visual processing patterns in the brain. In particular, existing research shows that FFA activation falls within the area of the brain that processes the immediate field of vision, whereas PPA activation is located in areas of the brain that handle peripheral vision and vision just out of the direct field of vision (Levy et al., 2001). This suggests that the FFA and PPA may have developed certain specializations due to the common visual tasks within those fields of view. Because faces are commonly processed in the immediate field of vision, the parts of the brain that process the direct field of vision eventually also specialize in more detailed tasks like face recognition. The same concept applies to place: because buildings and locations are often viewed in their entirety either right outside the field of vision or in an individual's periphery, any building or location visual specialization will be processed within the areas of the brain handling peripheral vision. As such, commonly seen shapes like houses and buildings become specialized in certain regions of the brain, i.e. the PPA.

== See also ==
- Visual agnosia
- Visual cortex
- Visual perception
- Visual system
- Predictive coding
- Spatial frequency
