= Das Problem der Willensfreiheit in der neuesten deutschen Philosophie =

1902 book by Leopold Müffelmann

Das Problem der Willensfreiheit in der neusten deutschen Philosophie
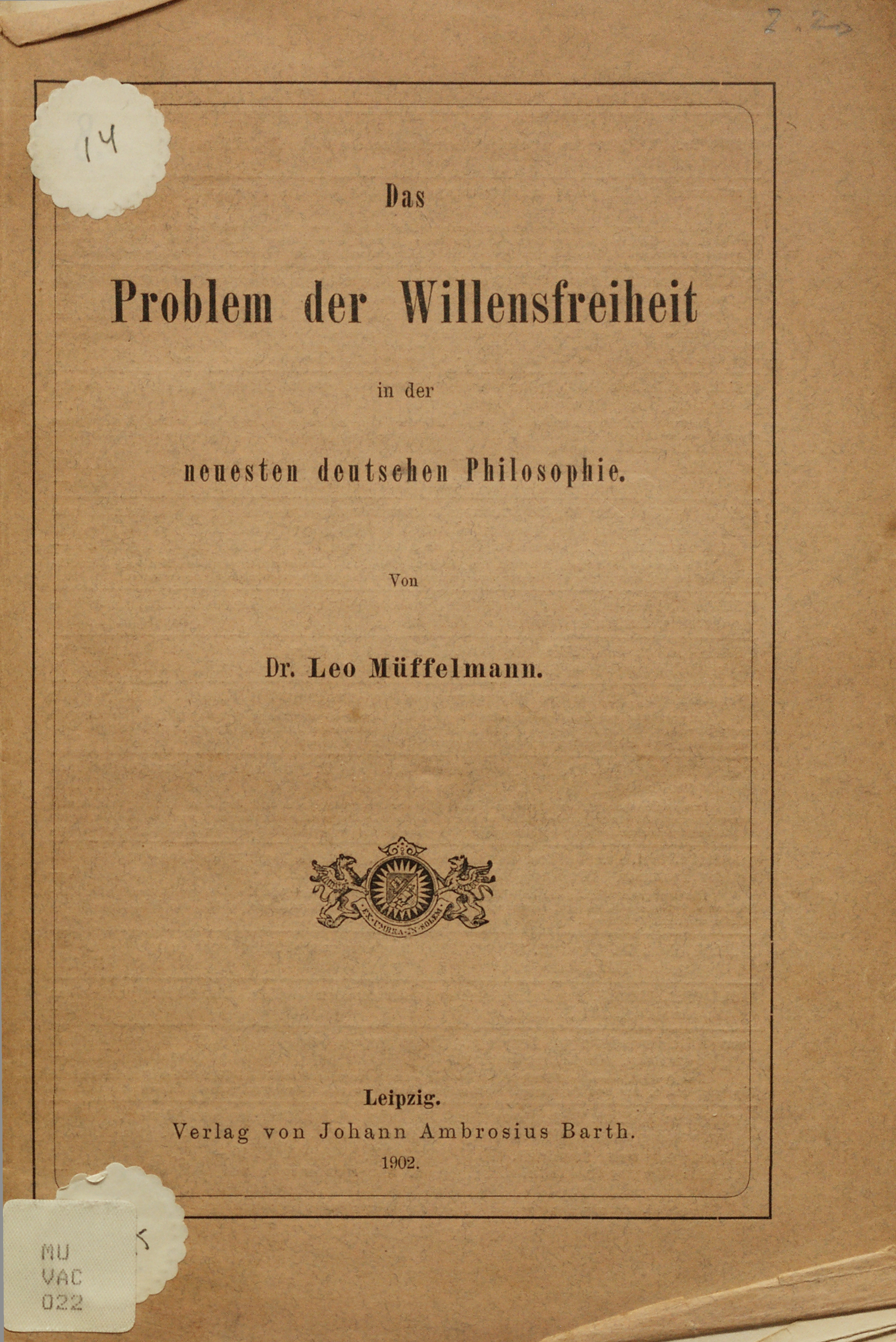
- Title page of the book
- Author: Dr. Leopold Müffelmann
- Language: German
- Subject: Free will
- Genre: Dissertation
- Set in: Leipzig, Germany
- Publication date: 1902
- Publication place: Germany
- Media type: print
- Pages: 115

Das Problem der Willensfreiheit in der neuesten deutschen Philosophie (English: The problem of free will within the newest German philosophy) is a book written by Dr. Leopold Müffelmann and published in Leipzig in 1902. It is the dissertation of Dr. Leopold Müffelmann who was a jurist and chief executive of the lodge of the Freemason, and summarizes historical viewpoints on the topic of free will with a focus on the common opinion within German philosophy in the early 20th century. The book considers the general ideas towards the problem, namely indeterminism, fatalism and determinism. Müffelmann treats the subject of free will rather objectively, however, it becomes apparent that his view towards the problem of free will is deterministic. In the dissertation Müffelmann argues, that the problem of free will is actually not as important as often claimed by philosophers and that ethical life and thought should not be made dependent upon it.

The book is divided into five main parts, which include an introduction to the meaning of the topic of free will, followed by the main part, which treats the Problem of free will and its solutions. This part is divided into solutions in the past and solutions in the present. The dissertation ends with a short outlook on the development of the problem of free will in the future.

== Historical context ==
The topic of free will is a highly debated topic within philosophy since many centuries. As stated by Müffelmann, first thoughts towards the question on whether our thoughts are free or determined arose in the ancient greek philosophy, specifically with the stoics. After that many important philosophers contributed their thoughts towards the topic establishing three main views. The book was written at the beginning of the 20th century, where the main streams towards the problem, which are determinism, indeterminism and fatalism were already settled. The "newest german philosophy" hardly contributes greatly new thoughts towards the debate, but rather finds new arguments for the main views previously mentioned.

== Content ==
The main part of the book deals with the problem of free will in German philosophy within the early 20th century. Müffelmann focuses on the three main streams towards free will within philosophy, which are indeterminism, fatalism and determinism. Müffelmann focuses on the viewpoints of some important philosophers and stresses that he only considers those authors who contributed something new to the undoubtedly old debate of free will.

=== Indeterminism ===
Müffelmann begins with explaining the views on indeterminism. This part is divided into six parts, namely the "Liberum arbiturium indifferentiae", the intelligible freedom, indeterminism in catholic philosophy, "agnostic indeterminism", indeterminism in criminal law and theology, and a retrospect. Müffelmann refers to Lotze and his student Sommer who are defenders of indeterminism. Their main claim can be put into a nutshell by saying that indeterminism is true because we all feel that we are free and denying our freedom would mean that humans have much less power than we hope to have. Müffelmann argues against this view. He stresses that the arguments for indeterminism are based on feelings rather than rationality. Importantly, he claims that indeterminism is not in line with our conception of a human personality. If nothing about our action was determined, so he claims, then every action would be happening due to chance. Additionally, Müffelmann argues against the argument that indeterminism is the only viewpoint that allows the maintenance of human dignity. According to Müffelmann, the subjective experience of freedom arises, when our actions are in line with our self. However, these actions are not independent of our surroundings and not a product of capriciousness.

=== Fatalism ===
Müffelmann goes on explaining fatalism, which neglects all of the premises indeterminism makes. According to fatalism, there is no such thing as freedom, humans have no power to influence the world in any way, there is no responsibility, and there is no accountability. Müffelmann stresses, that the boundaries between fatalism and determinism are often blurry and that different philosophers often argue in line with both views. According to Müffelmann the newest German philosophy barely argues in line with fatalism and the only thing that fatalism left which is still influential is the materialistic worldview. Philosophers who were mentioned to be fatalists are Ernst Haeckel and the positivist Paul Rée.

=== Determinism ===
When explaining determinism, Müffelmann focuses on four main points. He begins with explaining indeterministic and fatalistic determinists, goes on with pure determinists, a statistics on moral, and a retrospect. The central claim of determinism is that every single action of will is motivated and caused by some reasons. Nevertheless, determinism accepts the premise of freedom by defining freedom as determinism of single actions by the self, by ones own character, by ones own individual personality. Important indeterministic determinists mentioned are Christoph von Sigwart and Wilhelm Wundt. Müffelmann himself agrees most with the view of determinism. He claims, that the reason why many people feel that freedom and determinism contradict each other, is that they confuse determinism with fatalism. However, if one accepts the determinists definition of freedom, determinism is most in line with conception of the human personality.

== Reception ==
In a book review in The Philosophical Review, W. G. Everett calls the work "a rather characteristic product of German scholarship" which will be useful "to students who desire an orientation in German thought on this much-debated problem. Everett notes that Müffelmann's own view is "deterministic", but that his defense is not as strong as it could have been, because he relies on his critique of indeterminism to make his case, rather than presenting his argument in a separate section.

== Bibliography ==
- Everett, W.G. (1904). "Das Problem der Willensfreiheit in der Neuesten Deutschen Philosophie by Leo Müffelmann". The Philosophical Review. 13 (2): 249–251. doi:10.2307/2176458. hdl:2027/hvd.hnv63e. JSTOR 2176458.
- Müffelmann, Leo (1902). Das Problem der Willensfreiheit in der neuesten deutschen Philosophie (PDF) (in German). Rostock: F. W. Willgeroth. pp. VIII, 121 pp.
- Noël, L. (1903). "Review: Das Problem der Willensfreiheit in der neuesten deutschen Philosophie by Leo Müffelmann". Revue néo-scolastique (in French). 10 (39): 329–331. JSTOR 26345652.
