= Two-streams hypothesis =

Model of the neural processing of vision and hearing

The two-streams hypothesis is a model of the neural processing of vision as well as hearing. The hypothesis, given its initial characterisation in papers by Leslie Ungerleider and Mortimer Mishkin in 1982 argued that primates possess two distinct visual systems. A decade later, David Milner and Melvyn A. Goodale in 1992, developed this further. Recently there seems to be evidence of two distinct auditory systems as well. As visual information exits the occipital lobe, and as sound leaves the phonological network, it follows two main pathways, or "streams". The ventral stream (also known as the "what pathway") leads to the temporal lobe, which is involved with object and visual identification and recognition. The dorsal stream (or, "where pathway") leads to the parietal lobe, which is involved with processing the object's spatial location relative to the viewer and with speech repetition.

== History ==
The dorsal stream (green) and ventral stream (purple) are shown. They originate from a common source in the visual cortex.

Several researchers had proposed similar ideas previously. The authors themselves credit the inspiration of work on blindsight by Weiskrantz, and previous neuroscientific vision research. Schneider first proposed the existence of two visual systems for localisation and identification in 1969. Ingle described two independent visual systems in frogs in 1973. Ettlinger reviewed the existing neuropsychological evidence of a distinction in 1990. Moreover, Trevarthen had offered an account of two separate mechanisms of vision in monkeys back in 1968.

In 1982, Ungerleider and Mishkin distinguished the dorsal and ventral streams, as processing spatial and visual features respectively, from their lesion studies of monkeys – proposing the original where vs what distinction. Though this framework was superseded by that of Milner & Goodale, it remains influential.

One hugely influential source of information that has informed the model has been experimental work exploring the extant abilities of visual agnosic patient D.F. The first, and most influential report, came from Goodale and colleagues in 1991 and work is still being published on her two decades later. This has been the focus of some criticism of the model due to the perceived over-reliance on findings from a single case.

== Two visual systems ==
Goodale and Milner amassed an array of anatomical, neuropsychological, electrophysiological, and behavioural evidence for their model. According to their data, the ventral 'perceptual' stream computes a detailed map of the world from visual input, which can then be used for cognitive operations, and the dorsal 'action' stream transforms incoming visual information to the requisite egocentric (head-centered) coordinate system for skilled motor planning. The model also posits that visual perception encodes spatial properties of objects, such as size and location, relative to other objects in the visual field; in other words, it utilizes relative metrics and scene-based frames of reference. Visual action planning and coordination, on the other hand, uses absolute metrics determined via egocentric frames of reference, computing the actual properties of objects relative to the observer. Thus, grasping movements directed towards objects embedded in size-contrast-ambiguous scenes have been shown to escape the effects of these illusions, as different frames of references and metrics are involved in the perception of the illusion versus the execution of the grasping act.

Norman proposed a similar dual-process model of vision, and described eight main differences between the two systems consistent with other two-system models.

Factor	Ventral system (what)	Dorsal system (how)
Function	Recognition/identification	Visually guided behaviour
Sensitivity	High spatial frequencies - details	High temporal frequencies - motion
Memory	Long-term stored representations	Only very short-term storage
Speed	Relatively slow	Relatively fast
Consciousness	Typically high	Typically low
Frame of reference	Allocentric or object-centered	Egocentric or viewer-centered
Visual input	Mainly foveal or parafoveal	Across retina
Monocular vision	Generally reasonably small effects	Often large effects e.g. motion parallax

=== Dorsal stream ===
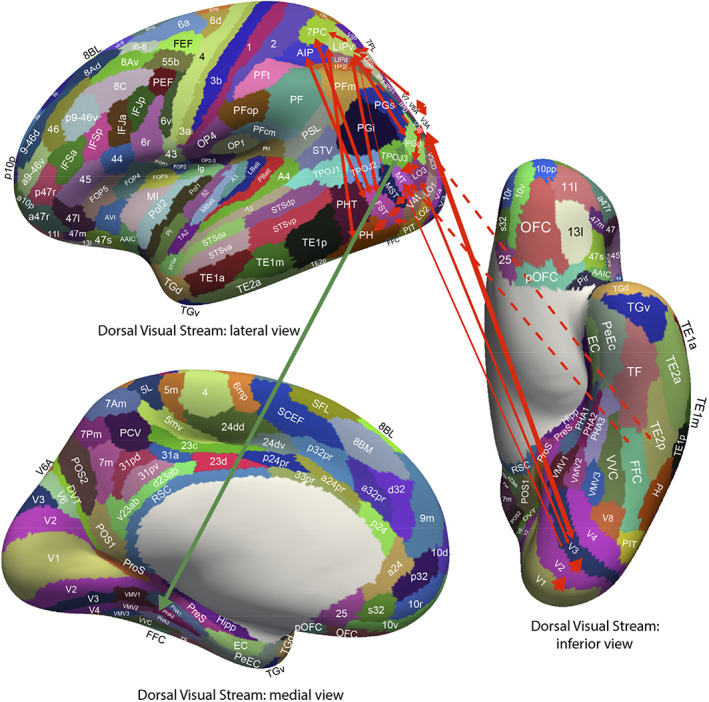
Connections of dorsal visual stream

The dorsal stream is proposed to be involved in the guidance of actions and recognizing where objects are in space. The dorsal stream projects from the primary visual cortex to the posterior parietal cortex. It was initially termed the "where" pathway since it was thought that the dorsal stream processes information regarding the spatial properties of an object. However, later research conducted on a famous neuropsychological patient, Patient D.F., revealed that the dorsal stream is responsible for processing the visual information needed to construct the representations of objects one wishes to manipulate. Those findings led the nickname of the dorsal stream to be updated to the "how" pathway. The dorsal stream is interconnected with the parallel ventral stream (the "what" stream) which runs downward from V1 into the temporal lobe.

==== General features ====
The dorsal stream is involved in spatial awareness and guidance of actions (e.g., reaching). In this it has two distinct functional characteristics – it contains a detailed map of the visual field, and is also good at detecting and analyzing movements.

The dorsal stream commences with purely visual functions in the occipital lobe before gradually transferring to spatial awareness at its termination in the parietal lobe.

The posterior parietal cortex is essential for "the perception and interpretation of spatial relationships, accurate body image, and the learning of tasks involving coordination of the body in space".

It contains individually functioning lobules. The lateral intraparietal sulcus (LIP) contains neurons that produce enhanced activation when attention is moved onto the stimulus or the animal saccades towards a visual stimulus, and the ventral intraparietal sulcus (VIP) where visual and somatosensory information are integrated.

==== Effects of damage or lesions ====
Damage to the posterior parietal cortex causes a number of spatial disorders including:

- Simultanagnosia: where the patient can only describe single objects without the ability to perceive it as a component of a set of details or objects in a context (as in a scenario, e.g. the forest for the trees).
- Optic ataxia: where the patient cannot use visuospatial information to guide arm movements.
- Hemispatial neglect: where the patient is unaware of the contralesional half of space (that is, they are unaware of things in their left field of view and focus only on objects in the right field of view; or appear unaware of things in one field of view when they perceive them in the other). For example, a person with this disorder may draw a clock, and then label all twelve of the numbers on one side of the face and consider the drawing complete.
- Akinetopsia: inability to perceive motion.
- Apraxia: inability to produce discretionary or volitional movement in the absence of muscular disorders.

=== Ventral stream ===
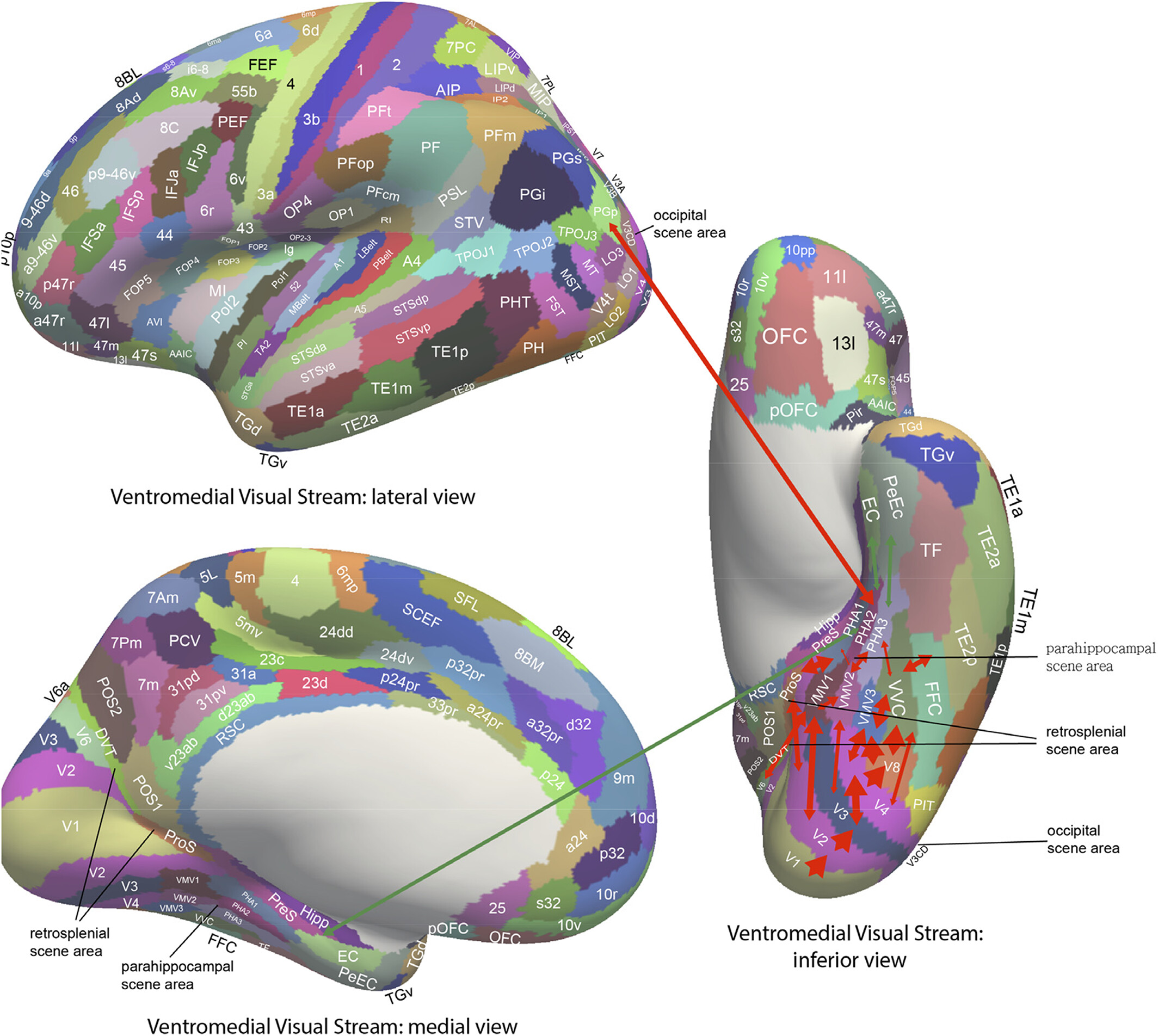
Ventromedial view of visual stream

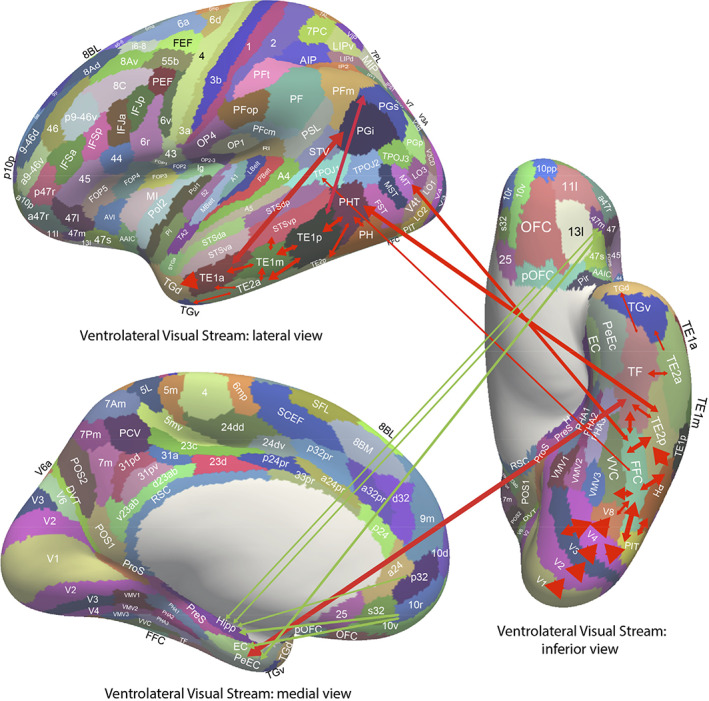
Ventolateral view of visual stream

The ventral stream is associated with object recognition and form representation. Also described as the "what" stream, it has strong connections to the medial temporal lobe (which is associated with long-term memories), the limbic system (which controls emotions), and the dorsal stream (which deals with object locations and motion).

The ventral stream gets its main input from the parvocellular (as opposed to magnocellular) layer of the lateral geniculate nucleus of the thalamus. These neurons project to V1 sublayers 4Cβ, 4A, 3B and 2/3a successively. From there, the ventral pathway goes through V2 and V4 to areas of the inferior temporal lobe: PIT (posterior inferotemporal), CIT (central inferotemporal), and AIT (anterior inferotemporal). Each visual area contains a full representation of visual space. That is, it contains neurons whose receptive fields together represent the entire visual field. Visual information enters the ventral stream through the primary visual cortex and travels through the rest of the areas in sequence.

Moving along the stream from V1 to AIT, receptive fields increase their size, latency, and the complexity of their tuning. For example, recent studies have shown that the V4 area is responsible for color perception in humans, and the V8 (VO1) area is responsible for shape perception, while the VO2 area, which is located between these regions and the parahippocampal cortex, integrates information about the color and shape of stimuli into a holistic image.

All the areas in the ventral stream are influenced by extraretinal factors in addition to the nature of the stimulus in their receptive field. These factors include attention, working memory, and stimulus salience. Thus the ventral stream does not merely provide a description of the elements in the visual world – it also plays a crucial role in judging the significance of these elements.

Damage to the ventral stream can cause inability to recognize faces or interpret facial expression.

== Two auditory systems ==
=== Auditory ventral stream ===
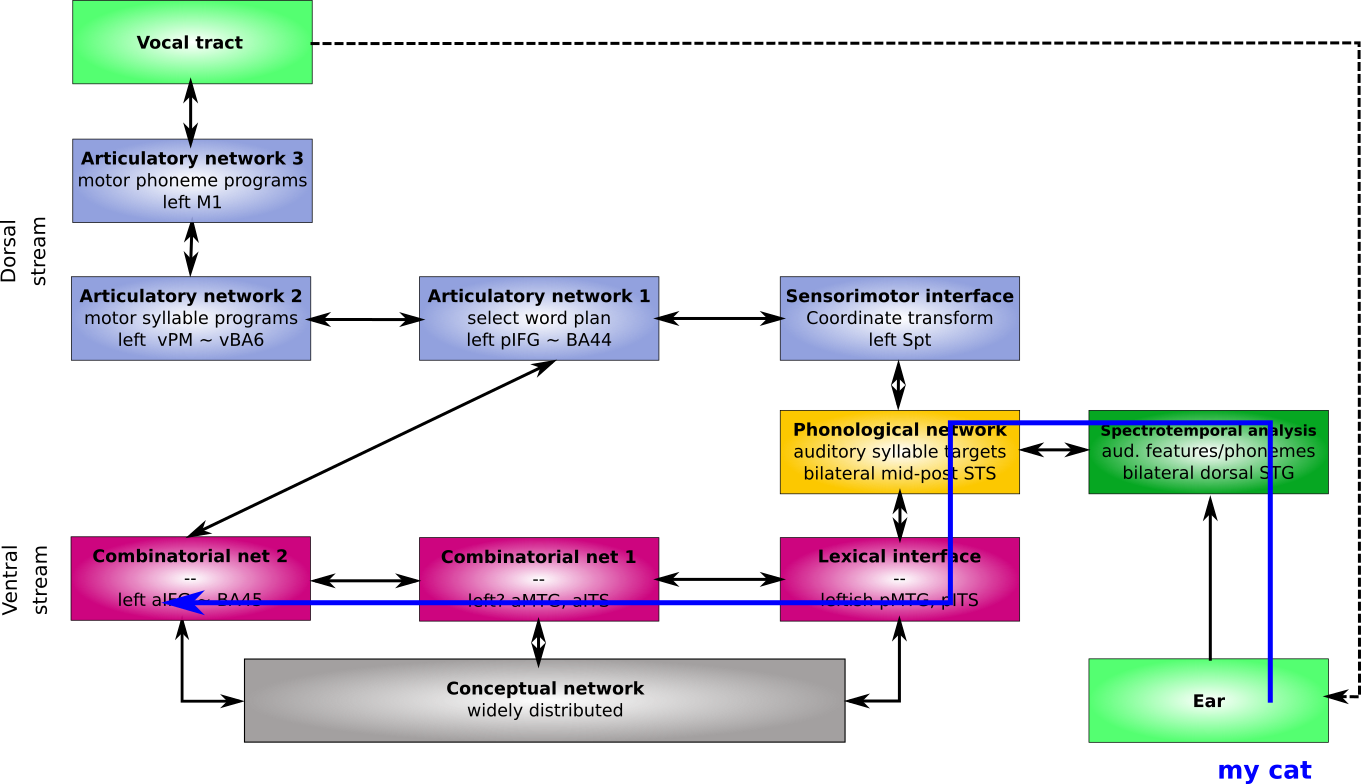
Comprehension of the phrase 'my cat' in the extended version of Hickok and Poeppel's dual pathway model

The two streams hypothesis of audition was largely proposed mainly by Hickok and Poeppel in 2004, from which they have continued to publish empirical evidence and updated reviews for this model. This comes off the heels of the visual two streams hypothesis, building on the idea that cortical structure and processing in both different areas of the brain as well as systemically merging perceptual circuitry with motor coordination and output to "match sound onto meaning and matching sound onto articulatory-based representations." Hickok and Poeppel also theorize that there is a possibility both dorsal and ventral streams have a level of "bidirectionality" – meaning that both pathways can function in a variety of ways with and apart from each other to facilitate speech perception and production.

Along with the visual ventral pathway being important for visual processing, there is also a ventral auditory pathway emerging from the primary auditory cortex. In this pathway, phonemes are processed posteriorly to syllables and environmental sounds. The information then joins the visual ventral stream at the middle temporal gyrus and temporal pole. Here the auditory objects are converted into audio-visual concepts. The ventral system is colloquially referred to as the "what" pathway which is due to the function of this pathway largely existing to merge sensory stimuli into digestible information for linguistic information. The ventral system is able to do this due to its focus on lexical interface – this interface consists of clusters of words in and out of context and their meanings (contextual or individual) as well as syntactic changes. Based on this, through several projections in the brain specifically to the Superior Temporal Gyrus, the ventral pathway helps to "map sound onto meaning."

=== Auditory dorsal stream ===
The function of the auditory dorsal pathway is to map the auditory sensory representations onto articulatory motor representations. Hickok & Poeppel claim that the auditory dorsal pathway is necessary because, "learning to speak is essentially a motor learning task. The primary input to this is sensory, speech in particular. So, there must be a neural mechanism that both codes and maintains instances of speech sounds, and can use these sensory traces to guide the tuning of speech gestures so that the sounds are accurately reproduced."

Hickok and Poeppel further explain that, while it involves an unyielding connection between speech manufacturing and discernment, there is little evidence that the dorsal stream is necessary for matching stimuli onto a mental picture or thematic idea and speech input portrayal. They further illustrate that the dorsal stream not only helps to "map sound onto articulatory-based representations," but it also helps to equalize the contributions of both "auditory and motor representations of speech," due to its neuronal connections to the frontal cortex. In contrast with the ventral stream (which, as mentioned before, is the driver behind syntactical and lexical meanings of words and auditory stimuli), the dorsal stream helps to drive how both word definitions and syntactical meaning get combined with motor output for speech. As stated before, these streams cannot work without each other.

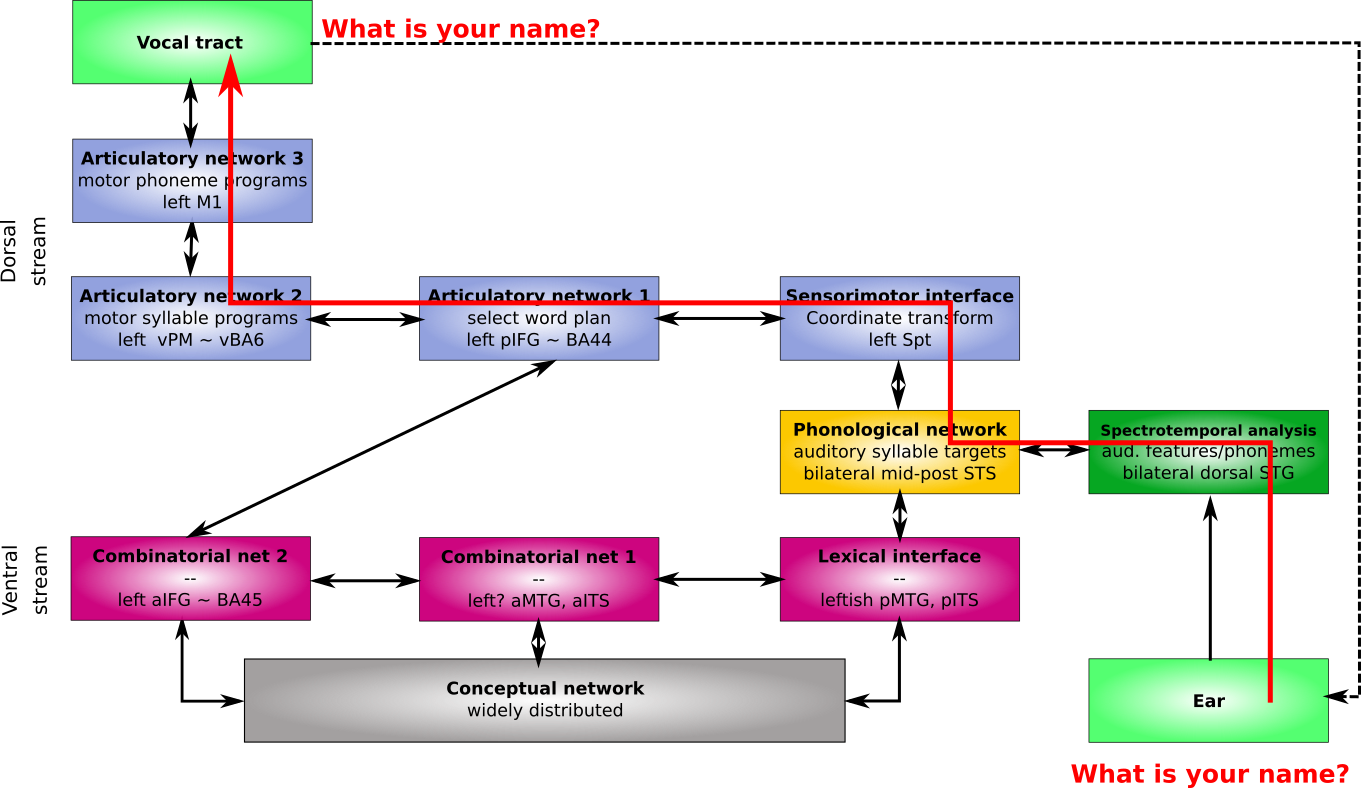
Repetition of the phrase 'what is your name?' in the extended version of Hickok and Poeppel's dual pathway model

In contrast to the ventral stream's auditory processing, information enters from the primary auditory cortex into the posterior superior temporal gyrus and posterior superior temporal sulcus. From there the information moves to the beginning of the dorsal pathway, which is located at the boundary of the temporal and parietal lobes near the Sylvian fissure. The first step of the dorsal pathway begins in the sensorimotor interface, located in the left Sylvian parietal temporal (Spt) (within the Sylvian fissure at the parietal-temporal boundary). The spt is important for perceiving and reproducing sounds. This is evident because its ability to acquire new vocabulary, be disrupted by lesions and auditory feedback on speech production, articulatory decline in late-onset deafness and the non-phonological residue of Wernicke's aphasia; deficient self-monitoring. It is also important for the basic neuronal mechanisms for phonological short-term memory. Without the Spt, language acquisition is impaired. The information then moves onto the articulatory network, which is divided into two separate parts. The articulatory network 1, which processes motor syllable programs, is located in the left posterior inferior temporal gyrus and Brodmann's area 44 (pIFG-BA44). The articulatory network 2 is for motor phoneme programs and is located in the left M1-vBA6.

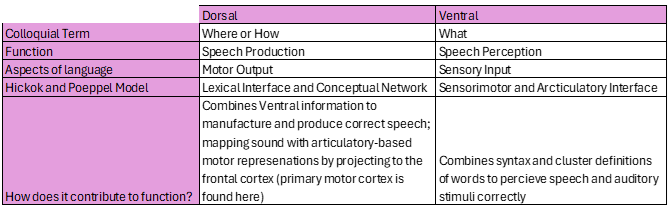
Summary Table of Dorsal and Ventral Streams - Audition

Table 2. Overview of both Dorsal and Ventral Auditory Streams

=== Disruptions with Language Perception and Production ===
Conduction aphasia affects a subject's ability to reproduce speech (typically by repetition), though it has no influence on the subject's ability to comprehend spoken language. This shows that conduction aphasia must reflect not an impairment of the auditory ventral pathway but instead of the auditory dorsal pathway. Buchsbaum et al found that conduction aphasia can be the result of damage, particularly lesions, to the Spt (Sylvian parietal temporal). This is shown by the Spt's involvement in acquiring new vocabulary, for while experiments have shown that most conduction aphasiacs can repeat high-frequency, simple words, their ability to repeat low-frequency, complex words is impaired. The Spt is responsible for connecting the motor and auditory systems by making auditory code accessible to the motor cortex. It appears that the motor cortex recreates high-frequency, simple words (like cup) in order to more quickly and efficiently access them, while low-frequency, complex words (like Sylvian parietal temporal) require more active, online regulation by the Spt. This explains why conduction aphasiacs have particular difficulty with low-frequency words which requires a more hands-on process for speech production. "Functionally, conduction aphasia has been characterized as a deficit in the ability to encode phonological information for production," namely because of a disruption in the motor-auditory interface. Conduction aphasia has been more specifically related to damage of the arcuate fasciculus, which is vital for both speech and language comprehension, as the arcuate fasciculus makes up the connection between Broca and Wernicke's areas.

In addition to conduction aphasia, other disorders like Pure Word Deafness can disrupt the two auditory streams circuitry. Pure Word Deafness, while rare, is a disorder characterized by a disconnection of both "auditory cortices" due to damage of the hemispheric communication in the brain. This would disrupt both the ventral and dorsal stream by making the patient unable to process auditory stimuli.

== Criticisms ==
Goodale & Milner's innovation was to shift the perspective from an emphasis on input distinctions, such as object location versus properties, to an emphasis on the functional relevance of vision to behaviour, for perception or for action. Contemporary perspectives however, informed by empirical work over the past two decades, offer a more complex account than a simple separation of function into two-streams. Recent experimental work for instance has challenged these findings, and has suggested that the apparent dissociation between the effects of illusions on perception and action is due to differences in attention, task demands, and other confounds. There are other empirical findings, however, that cannot be so easily dismissed which provide strong support for the idea that skilled actions such as grasping are not affected by pictorial illusions.

Moreover, recent neuropsychological research has questioned the validity of the dissociation of the two streams that has provided the cornerstone of evidence for the model. The dissociation between visual agnosia and optic ataxia has been challenged by several researchers as not as strong as originally portrayed; Hesse and colleagues demonstrated dorsal stream impairments in patient DF; Himmelbach and colleagues reassessed DF's abilities and applied more rigorous statistical analysis demonstrating that the dissociation was not as strong as first thought.

A 2009 review of the accumulated evidence for the model concluded that whilst the spirit of the model has been vindicated the independence of the two streams has been overemphasised. Goodale & Milner themselves have proposed the analogy of tele-assistance, one of the most efficient schemes devised for the remote control of robots working in hostile environments. In this account, the dorsal stream is viewed as a semi-autonomous function that operates under guidance of executive functions which themselves are informed by ventral stream processing.

Thus the emerging perspective within neuropsychology and neurophysiology is that, whilst a two-systems framework was a necessary advance to stimulate study of the highly complex and differentiated functions of the two neural pathways; the reality is more likely to involve considerable interaction between vision-for-action and vision-for-perception. Robert McIntosh and Thomas Schenk summarize this position as follows:

We should view the model not as a formal hypothesis, but as a set of heuristics to guide experiment and theory. The differing informational requirements of visual recognition and action guidance still offer a compelling explanation for the broad relative specializations of dorsal and ventral streams. However, to progress the field, we may need to abandon the idea that these streams work largely independently of one other, and to address the dynamic details of how the many visual brain areas arrange themselves from task to task into novel functional networks.

— Thomas Schenk and Robert D. McIntosh, "Do We Have Independent Visual Streams for Perception and Action?"

Additionally, Hickok and Poeppel mention that, while this framework is a model that can be corroborated with empirical evidence, it is still a broad overview of what may be happening in the brain and due to this pathway attempting to tackle a very large and complicated subject, details can be missed. This model, therefore, should be used as a guide and a reference for basic understanding, and should not be treated as 100% correct and written in stone. They mention that, while different models by other authors can fit into their basic heuristic, the field of neurolinguistics is ever growing and changing, and this model is just one hypothesis to a very large field.

== See also ==
- Language processing in the brain
- Vision for perception and vision for action
- Visual memory
- Visual cortex
- Magnocellular cell
- Tectopulvinar pathway
- Object recognition (cognitive science)
- Medial superior temporal area
- Lateral pulvinar nucleus
- Pulvinar nuclei
- Phantom contour
- Parasol cell
- Constructional apraxia
- Koniocellular cell
