= Apperceptive agnosia =

Inability to recognize things due to failures in perception

Apperceptive agnosia is a neurological disorder characterized by failures in recognition due to a failure of perception. In contrast, associative agnosia is a type of agnosia where perception occurs but recognition still does not occur. When referring to apperceptive agnosia, visual and object agnosia are most commonly discussed; this occurs because apperceptive agnosia is most likely to present visual impairments. However, in addition to visual apperceptive agnosia there are also cases of apperceptive agnosia in other sensory areas.

== Auditory apperceptive agnosia ==
Auditory apperceptive agnosia are impairments in audition that take place despite intact audiogram. In some cases the deficit is in the ability to recognize spoken words, and in other cases, may be a deficit in recognizing environmental sounds. In all cases individuals are able to read, write, name objects, and converse intelligently. Similar to visual impairments, the deficit arise because of damage in the primary sensory cortex. In the case of auditory agnosia, lesions are present in the superior temporal gyrus bilaterally or in the posterior temporal lobe of the language-dominant (typically left) hemisphere.

In addition to verbal and nonverbal auditory agnosia, there are cases of auditory apperceptive agnosia where patients are unable to recognize music in the absence of sensory, intellectual, and verbal impairments. In these cases there may be a melodic or a memory basis established in the brain and damage to those areas lead to music agnosia. Agnosia occurs because of failure to re-encode melodic information properly. This tends to be associated with right-sided lesions interrupting the melodic route in the brain.

== Tactile apperceptive agnosia ==
Tactile apperceptive agnosia results in the inability to shape representations specific to tactile modality. The impairment is restricted to the hands even though sensation is not impaired. This is similar to visual apperceptive agnosia in that it is a basic level of processing that is impaired. Some individuals are unable to recognize objects by touch because of a small cerebral infarction. Tactile apperceptive agnosia can also affect blind people. A seventy-three year old woman, who was blind since she was born, had been 17 days post coronary bypass grafting, when she started to present some concerns related to her ability to read Braille properly, after being able to read it proficiently from the age of seven. After the surgery, her reading speed was reduced by 75–80%. She was diagnosed with Braille alexia, a rare form of tactile apperceptive agnosia, three months after her surgery, which effects the ability to join to gather tactile stimuli and the processing of that information. Braille reading speed can be affected by this condition, being slowed down due to the reduced pace of processing tactile information.

== Olfactory agnosia ==
Olfactory agnosia is when a patient can smell something, but they can't identify what the smell is. Like other forms of agnosia, this neural olfactory loss can be due to brain damage, or various diseases like Alzheimer's and Parkinson's disease.

== Apperceptive visual agnosia ==
Apperceptive visual agnosia is a visual impairment that results in a patient's inability to name objects. While agnosics suffer from severe deficits, patients' visual acuity and other visual abilities such as perceiving parts and colours remain intact. Deficits seem to occur because of damage to early-level perceptual processing. While patients are able to effectively allocate attention to locate the object and perceive the parts, they are unable to group together the parts they see and name the object accurately. This is demonstrated by the fact that patients are more effective at naming two attributes from a single object than they are able to name one attribute on each of the two superimposed objects. In addition they are still able to describe objects in detail and recognize objects by touch.

=== Origin ===
Following Hermann Munk's identification of a condition he called "Seelenblindheit" (mind-blindness) Heinrich Lissauer published an exhaustive diagnostic evaluation of a patient who could not, or only with great difficulty, visually identify common objects. Because primary visual processing was intact, Lissauer considered the possible diagnostic distinction between deficits in perception (apperceptive agnosia) and in recognition (associative agnosia).

The topic became prominent when Kurt Goldstein and Adhėmar Gelb published performance details of a patient Schn. with shrapnel fragments in the brain, the result of being wounded in World War I. He was followed over many years and created a great deal of controversy when subsequent tests were found to be at variance with the original findings.

=== Effects ===
Apperceptive visual agnosia results in profound difficulties on a patient's ability to recognize visually presented information. Apperceptive agnosia affects the perceptual processing of individuals. Impairments of elements such as color and motion makes it difficult to interpret shape or the spatial arrangements of objects. Deficits in apperceptive agnosics have not been linked to deficits in acuity. Additionally, patients have an intact ability to attend to cued stimuli. They have the ability to maintain fixation, reach for moving targets, and write as well. Those with apperceptive agnosia, however, have difficulty copying geometric shapes and letters. In some cases individuals are able to trace letters and shapes with their finger but they are unable to use the technique as a strategy to name objects.

Deficits in apperceptive agnosics seem to be differential based on categories. Apperceptive agnosia has been noted to affect both broad and specific deficits. Specific deficits include impairments in the recognition of body parts, buildings, manipulated objects, animals, and places. Picture naming is impaired in apperceptive visual agnosia but recognition of objects can be achieved through accessing other modalities. For example, an object can be recognized through touch. Also when it is spoken about, individuals with apperceptive agnosia are able to define the object. The continuing of the ability of patients to recognize the object through use of different sensory modalities shows that deficits arise because of a breakdown in the interaction between visual systems and semantic memory.

== Location of brain damage ==
Each patient that suffers from apperceptive agnosia does not have brain damage in exactly the same area. However, brain damage in proximity to the occipital lobe is largely correlated with the patterns of deficit seen in apperceptive agnosics. For example, patient JB suffered extensive damage to the parietal-occipital areas to the left cerebral hemisphere leading to his deficit in the ability to name distinguish between structurally similar object.

Visually presented object recognition is largely mediated by a hierarchical occipitotemporal pathway. This pathway facilitates the distinction between regions allowing the processing of the visual features of objects. In addition the occipitoparietal pathway is sometimes damaged in apperceptive agnosia patients. Damage to this region leads to impairments in localization of visual stimuli.

== Theories of causation ==
No two apperceptive agnosic patients are the same, but case studies have been used to make theories on what causes the object recognition deficits. While it is established that semantics plays a large role in apperceptive agnosia deficits, it is not agreed upon how semantics alter recognition processes. One theory proposes that semantic memories are divided into differential semantic categories. Brain damage leads to apperceptive agnosia because there is damage to a particular semantic category. Another theory, referred to as functional specialization, states that individual parts of the brain specialize in different tasks. According to this theory, if an area of the brain is damaged, the function that the area is responsible for may decline as well. Yet another theory suggests that the pattern of deficit arise from independent impairments to a particular input modality and a single non perceptual semantic system that is organized by category. Deficits are largely due to semantics, however many categories are related perceptually as well. Objects that are biologically similar are likely to have physical resemblance to each other as well. Evidence for this arises in the finding that perceptual confusion arises because of structural similarity contributes or accounts for some modality specific deficit.

Object processing is said to occur by two processes. There is first a stage of object perception. In this step there is mapping of visual description from the stimulus to a set of stored structural descriptions onto a set of structural descriptions of familiar objects. In the second stage, there is object identification. In this step the structural description is mapped onto the semantic representations giving rise to a full specification of the object. Researchers differ in their belief of how perceptual knowledge has an effect. Some believe that the loss of perceptual attributes should always accompany structural similarity. Others observe that perceptual and structural information often accompany each other but they believe that the information can occur independently from each other. Based on patient information it seems that objects belonging to a category with many structurally similar neighbours would be vulnerable to this semantic access impairment.

== Case studies ==
No two apperceptive agnosics are the same so it is beneficial to look at individuals who suffer from apperceptive agnosia to see the range of impairments that can occur and the range of functioning that can remain.

=== JB ===
Patient JB was able to match spoken words to target pictures almost perfectly when the target was presented with three other dissimilar distractors from the same semantic category. However, when the distractors were similar to each other and from the same semantic category his functioning decreased significantly. His abilities show evidence that the problem may lie in an interaction between processes involved in specification of the object's visual structural description and access to semantic systems.

=== ELM ===
Patient ELM was sixty-one years old when this case study was under review. In 1982, he was first admitted to a hospital for atrial fibrillation, and presented symptoms of left-right confusion, nominal dysphasia, agraphia (minus the alexia), and dysgraphia. After further examination, it was discovered that ELM had a cortical lesion in his left hemisphere in the temporal lobe. ELM has deficits in the ability to name drawings of living things even though her ability to name man-made things remain intact. The early visual processing of shapes appear to be intact as well. In addition, unlike many patients, the ability to identify overlapping drawings of man-made objects remained intact. ELM was able to match both living and non-living things viewed from different perspectives. ELM's deficit lied in the fact that she was not able to distinguish between drawings that were real and plausibly unreal objects that were living; however, she was able to make the distinction when the objects were man made. Her impairments resulted due to damage to structural description of living things. There were problems with integrating features of structurally similar shapes of objects belonging to the same semantic category. This inability might be because of the distance between associated objects. The ones that are semantically close to each other are harder to differentiate.

=== HJA ===
HJA had deficits in differentiating between living things. She also made errors while naming line drawings. Instead of naming the pictures HJA frequently gave feature-by-feature description of the object (e.g. instead of saying circle, she would say many little dots). In addition, she would separate parts of drawn object instead of saying the name of the whole (e.g. handle and hairs when referring to paintbrush). HJA has problems segmenting global shapes when elements are closely grouped together. However, unlike the other patients, HJA has no problem copying and identifying overlapping drawings. In addition, HJA was able to draw objects accurately from the memory.

== Populations affected ==
There are subsets of groups in which apperceptive agnosia is more widespread.

=== Alzheimer's disease ===
Visual agnosia (both apperceptive and associative) is prevalent in Alzheimer's disease (AD) patients. Visual agnosia may be present in early stages of AD and can often act as an indicator of AD. Apperceptive agnosia results from diffuse cortical pathology of AD. There is early involvement in the hippocampus and the entorhinal cortex followed by a spread to adjacent areas with neurofibrillary tangles (NFT). Gradual extension of NFT throughout the occipital, parietal, and temporal regions devoted to vision occur resulting in visual agnosia.

== See also ==
- Agnosia
- Associative visual agnosia
- Aphasia
- Visual agnosia
- Visual space
- Patient DF
