= Medial superior temporal area =

Part of the brain

The medial superior temporal (MST) area is a part of the cerebral cortex, which lies in the dorsal stream of the visual area of the primate brain. The MST receives most of its inputs from the middle temporal (MT) area, which is involved primarily in the detection of motion. The MST uses the incoming information to compute things such as optic flow.
