= Inferior pulvinar nucleus =

Cluster of neurons of Thalamus

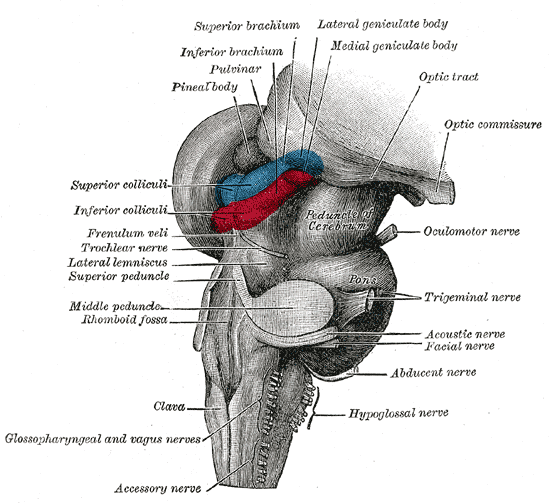
- Hind- and mid-brains; postero-lateral view. (Pulvinar visible near top.)

- Thalamic nuclei: MNG = Midline nuclear group AN = Anterior nuclear group MD = Medial dorsal nucleus VNG = Ventral nuclear group VA = Ventral anterior nucleus VL = Ventral lateral nucleus VPL = Ventral posterolateral nucleus VPM = Ventral posteromedial nucleus LNG = Lateral nuclear group PUL = Pulvinar; MTh = Metathalamus; LG = Lateral geniculate nucleus MG = Medial geniculate nucleus

Details
- Part of: pulvinar

Identifiers
- Latin: nucleus pulvinaris inferior

Inferior pulvinar nucleus (nucleus pulvinaris inferior) is one of four traditionally anatomically distinguished nuclei of the pulvinar of the thalamus. The other three nuclei of the pulvinar are called lateral, anterior and medial pulvinar nuclei.

== Connections ==
=== Afferent ===
- Inferior pulvinar nucleus, together with its lateral and medial nuclei, receives afferent input from superior colliculus.

=== Efferent ===
- Inferior pulvinar nucleus, together with its lateral nucleus, both have projections to the early visual cortical areas.

== Functions ==
- Inferior pulvinar nucleus, together with its lateral and medial nuclei, is thought to be important for the initiation and compensation of saccadic movements of the eyes. Those nuclei also participate in the visual attention regulation.

== Clinical significance ==
Lesions of the inferior pulvinar nucleus can result in neglect syndromes and attentional deficits.
