= Lateral pulvinar nucleus =

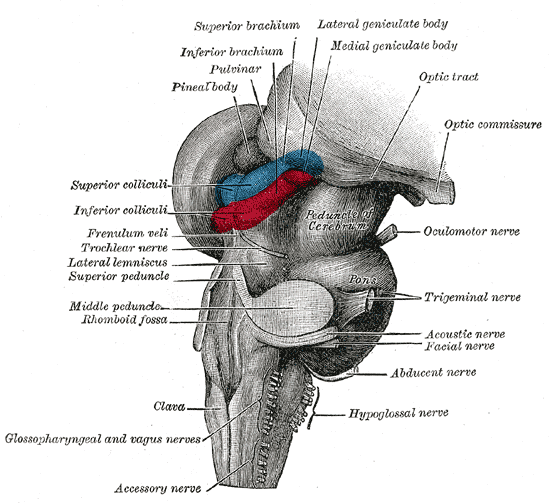
- Hind- and mid-brains; postero-lateral view. (Pulvinar visible near top.)

- Thalamic nuclei: MNG = Midline nuclear group AN = Anterior nuclear group MD = Medial dorsal nucleus VNG = Ventral nuclear group VA = Ventral anterior nucleus VL = Ventral lateral nucleus VPL = Ventral posterolateral nucleus VPM = Ventral posteromedial nucleus LNG = Lateral nuclear group PUL = Pulvinar; MTh = Metathalamus; LG = Lateral geniculate nucleus MG = Medial geniculate nucleus

Details
- Part of: pulvinar

Identifiers
- Latin: nucleus pulvinaris lateralis

Lateral pulvinar nucleus (nucleus pulvinaris lateralis) is one of four traditionally anatomically distinguished nuclei of the pulvinar of the thalamus. The other three nuclei of the pulvinar are called anterior, inferior and medial pulvinar nuclei.

== Connections ==
=== Afferent ===
- Lateral pulvinar nucleus, together with its inferior and medial nuclei, receives afferent input from superior colliculus.
- The dorsal part of the lateral pulvinar nucleus also receives afferent input from posterior parietal cortex and the dorsal stream cortical areas.

=== Efferent ===
- Lateral pulvinar nucleus, together with its inferior nucleus, both have projections to the early visual cortical areas.
- The dorsal part of the lateral pulvinar nucleus also sends its efferent output connections to the posterior parietal cortex and the dorsal stream cortical areas.

== Functions ==
- Lateral pulvinar nucleus, together with its inferior and medial nuclei, is thought to be important for the initiation and compensation of saccadic movements of the eyes. Those nuclei also participate in the visual attention regulation.

== Clinical significance ==
Lesions of the lateral pulvinar nucleus can result in neglect syndromes and attentional deficits.
