= Patient DF =

Psychiatric patient with a visual perception disorder

Patient DF is a woman with visual apperceptive agnosia who has been studied extensively due to the implications of her behavior for the two streams theory of visual perception. Though her vision remains intact, she has trouble visually locating and identifying objects. Despite being unable to identify or recognize objects, DF can still use visual input to guide her action.

Her agnosia is thought to be caused by a bilateral lesion to her lateral occipital cortex, an area thought by dual-stream proponents to be the ventral "object recognition" stream.

== Lesion ==
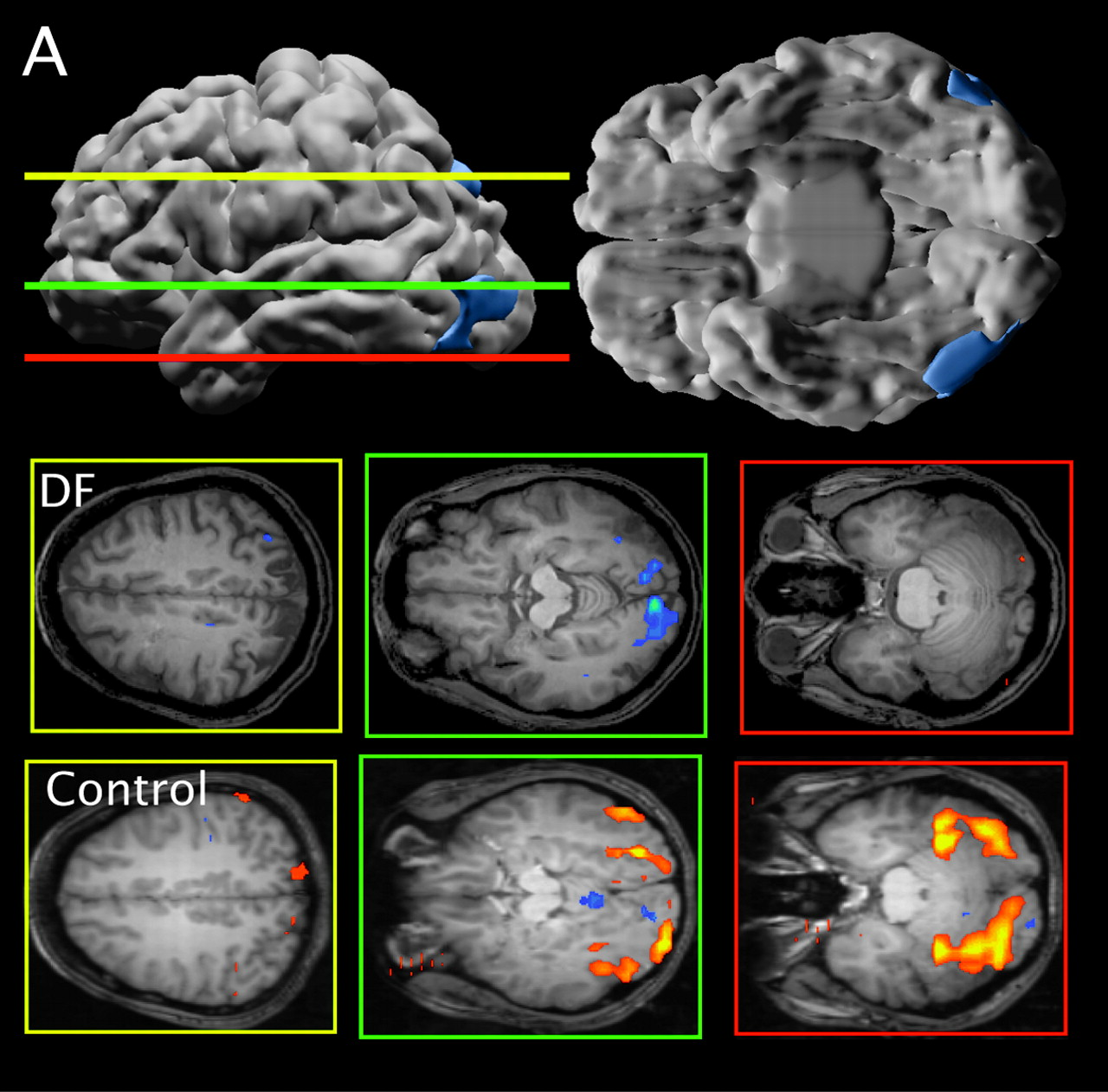
DF Lesion

Patient DF's brain damage resulted from hypoxia due to accidental carbon monoxide poisoning in 1988, when she was 34 years old. The lateral occipital cortex (LOC) in her brain is severely damaged and shows no activation presented with line drawings of common objects where healthy people usually do. Moreover, there is a reduction of white matter connections between LOC and other areas. There is also some shrinkage in the intraparietal sulcus, often implicated in the dorsal stream for visuomotor control. The fusiform face area is intact. This would suggest the problem in DF's perception is disconnectivity between higher and lower order functioning.

Recent MRIs have shown many enlarged sulci, like the intraparietal sulcus, parieto-occipital sulcus, and left calcarine sulcus, indicating atrophy. Her visual field remains intact up to 30 degrees.

== Performance ==
Like most apperceptive agnosics, DF cannot name an object from its appearance purely, or copy a line drawing. She can draw familiar objects from memory. DF can also differentiate color, motion and patterns—given an image and its scrambled version, she can tell them apart—but if shown different shapes in the same color and pattern, she is at chance at differentiating the two. She can identify 67% of grayscale and color images, but only 10% of line drawings.

Despite her inability to identify objects by shape, her actions seem to reflect a deeper understanding than she reports: DF correctly orients her hand to post a letter through a slot, picks up pebble-like objects at secure grasp points, and scales her grip correctly to pick up Efron blocks (which match in surface area, texture, mass, and color, and differ only in length and width).

And yet, Patient DF cannot judge the width of an object, such as a guitar pick, by using her thumb and forefinger to show how big it is. However, when asked to pick it up, her hand moves to the correct width. Her estimates (she is asked to put her thumb and forefinger the correct distance apart without moving to grasp the object) still do not improve thereafter, but she continues to accurately pick up the object, indicating that she cannot judge features of the object on command but is able to control her actions with that information.

DF does not benefit from haptic feedback—allowing her to pick up an object does not let her better estimate its width next time. DF also does not use visual information about her grasp: when she can only see her grip in a distorted mirror, her performance does not change. Consistent with all of this, brain imaging has shown no response to line drawings in her ventral stream. Furthermore, according to fMRI studies, the intraparietal sulcus showed preference for grasping motions over reaching motions—actually grabbing an object, in both DF and control patients, activates the intraparietal sulcus more than reaching.

== Implications ==
It is safe to say that "behavioural dissociation between action and perception, coupled with the neuroanatomical and functional neuroimaging findings suggest that the preserved visual control of grasping in DF is mediated by relatively intact visuomotor networks in her dorsal stream, whereas her failure to perceive the form of objects is a consequence of damage to her ventral stream".

Along with double dissociations shown in monkeys, DF's experience provides evidence for the two streams theory of visual perception and shows that the dorsal stream alone may provide information for aperture scaling. Some of the results from DF have been called into question due to the role of haptic feedback in DF's grasping and perception task performance.
