= Navon figure =

Larger shape built out of smaller, distinct shapes. e.g a large "N" drawn in small "a"s

A Navon figure is made of a larger recognisable shape, such as a letter, composed of copies of a smaller different shape. Navon figures are used in tests of visual neglect. The research of David Navon demonstrated that global features are perceived more quickly than local features. Jules Davidoff also performed research, but in a remote culture, finding opposite results; the participants more readily identified the local features. Patients with simultanagnosia have difficulty identifying global features, and when presented with a Navon figure will identify only the local features. A 2010 study comparing global-local processing in different races, found that East Asians demonstrated significantly stronger global processing than Caucasians.

== Example ==
A letter T (global) composed of repeat copies of the letter S (local).

 SSSSSSSSSSSSSSSSSSSSSSSSS
 SSSSSSSSSSSSSSSSSSSSSSSSS
 SS        SSSSS        SS
           SSSSS
           SSSSS
           SSSSS
           SSSSS
           SSSSS
           SSSSS
          SSSSSSS
       SSSSSSSSSSSSS

== The Navon effect ==
Reading Navon figures has been found to affect a range of tasks. It has been shown that just 5 minutes reading out the small letters of Navon figures has a detrimental effect on face recognition. The size of the Navon effect has been found to be influenced by the properties of the image. The effect is short lived (lasting less than a couple of minutes).

The Navon effect has also been observed in other tasks such as golf putting where reading the small Navon letters leads to poorer putting performance.

== See also ==
- ASCII art
