= Vision for perception and vision for action =

Types of visual processing in the brain

Vision for perception and vision for action in neuroscience literature refers to two types of visual processing in the brain: visual processing to obtain information about the features of objects such as color, size, shape (vision for perception) versus processing needed to guide movements such as catching a baseball (vision for action). An idea is currently debated that these types of processing are done by anatomically different brain networks. Ventral visual stream subserves vision for perception, whereas dorsal visual stream subserves vision for action. This idea finds support in clinical research and animal experiments.

== Visual Processing in the Brain ==
Visual stimuli have been known to process through the brain via two streams: the dorsal stream and the ventral stream. The dorsal pathway is commonly referred to as the ‘where’ system; this allows the processing of location, distance, position, and motion. This pathway spreads from the primary visual cortex dorsally to the parietal lobe. Information then feeds into the motor cortex of the frontal lobe. The second pathway, the ventral stream, processes information relating to shape, size, objects, orientation, and text. This is commonly known as the ‘what’ system. Visual stimuli in this system process ventrally from the primary visual cortex to the medial temporal lobe. In childhood development, vision for action and vision for perception develop at different rates, supporting the hypothesis of two distinct, linear streams for visual processing.

The above hypothesis has recently been challenged by a new and more parsimonious hypothesis with regard to evolution. The two streams must work hand-in-hand while processing visual information. Neuroanatomical and function neuroimaging studies have proven multiple visual maps that exist in the posterior brain, regarding at least 40 distinct regions. A single part of the outside world controls visual processing, and then particular areas are recognized in which single cells react to specific stimuli, such as faces. This hypothesis, one that indicates a more network-like model, is becoming more and more accepted among researchers. The pathway model mentioned above now experiences many conflicts. It has been discovered experimentally that there is more than just one way to process actions. For example, three distinct processing routes could exist dorsally, one for grasping, another for reaching, and yet a third for awareness of personal actions. No longer can just one dorsal stream be accounted for with regard to processing vision for action. The previous hypothesis also states that there is a clear hierarchy in which processing of visual stimuli goes from least complex to most complex in a linear fashion. However, lesions at one end should therefore have the same effect on the opposite end, and this cannot be observed experimentally. This further proves the integration of the two streams and many visual processes operating in parallel, involving multiple ventral and dorsal streams in a patchwork-type model.

However, while there exists to be two different hypotheses regarding the processing of vision in the human brain, it is still possible to accept both. Recent experiments prove that difficulties arise when deciphering between vision for action and vision for perception. A clear distinction between the two is difficult to make. Studies prove visual illusions that involve perception more so have considerable results on action. This can clearly rule out the first hypothesis noted above, indicating the thought that visually directed actions always avoid the matter of perception. However, a weaker form of the first hypothesis can still be considered. This states that the content of conscious perception will sometimes influence action, but that its impact on action is less asserted. Both the assumed ventral and dorsal streams can provide guidance of action, however information processed ventrally appears less pronounced and appears more substantial in the processing of perceptual tasks. It has been noted that one can still accept the two-stream hypothesis, but in doing so one must also realize that such a hypothesis still acknowledges the sharing of visual information across pathways and functions, heavily shaped by behavioral tasks.

== See also ==
- Two-streams hypothesis
