= Simultanagnosia =

Inability to visually perceive more than one object at a time

Simultanagnosia (or simultagnosia) is a rare neurological disorder characterized by the inability of an individual to visually perceive more than a single object at a time. This type of visual attention problem is one of three major components (the others being optic ataxia and optic apraxia) of Bálint's syndrome, an uncommon and incompletely understood variety of severe neuropsychological impairments involving space representation (visuospatial processing). The term "simultanagnosia" was first coined in 1924 by Wolpert to describe a condition where the affected individual could see individual details of a complex scene but failed to grasp the overall meaning of the image.

Simultanagnosia can be divided into two different categories: dorsal and ventral. Ventral occipito-temporal lesions cause a mild form of the disorder, while dorsal occipito-parietal lesions cause a more severe form of the disorder.

== Description ==
Patients with simultanagnosia, a component of Bálint's syndrome, have a restricted spatial window of visual attention and cannot see more than one object at a time in a scene that contains more than one object. For instance, if presented with an image of a table containing both food and various utensils, a patient will report seeing only one item, such as a spoon. If the patient's attention is redirected to another object in the scene, such as a glass, the patient will report that they see the glass but no longer see the spoon. As a result of this impairment, simultanagnosic patients often fail to comprehend the overall meaning of a scene.

In addition, patients note that one stationary object may spontaneously disappear from view as they become aware of another object in the scene.

Simultanagnosic patients often exhibit a phenomenon known as "local capture" where they only identify the local elements of stimuli containing local and global features. However, studies have demonstrated that implicit processing of the global structure can occur. With the appropriate stimulus conditions, explicit processing of the global form may occur. For example, a study performed with Navon hierarchical letters, which are large letters composed of smaller ones, revealed that the use of smaller and denser Navon letters biased the patient towards global processing.

== Diagnosis ==
There are currently no quantitative methods for diagnosing simultanagnosia. To establish the presence of simultanagnosic symptoms, patients are asked to describe complex visual displays, such as the commonly used "Boston Cookie Theft" picture, which is a component of the Boston Diagnostic Aphasia Examination. In the picture, the sink in the kitchen is overflowing as a boy and a girl attempt to steal cookies from the cookie jar without their mother noticing.

Patients take a clearly piecemeal approach to interpreting the scene by reporting isolated items from the image. For instance, a patient may report seeing a "boy," "stool," and a "woman." However, when asked to interpret the overall meaning of the picture, the patient fails to comprehend the global whole. Another picture used to assess visual impairments of patients with simultanagnosia is the "Telegraph Boy" picture. Upon examination of higher nervous system functions, patients display no general intellectual impairments.

== Classification ==
Simultanagnosia can be divided into two different types: dorsal and ventral, with each taking its name from the dorsal and ventral circuits concerned with the perception of objects' shapes and locations, respectively. These two forms of simultanagnosia are associated with different symptoms as well as damage to separate areas of the brain.

=== Dorsal simultanagnosia ===
Dorsal simultanagnosia results from bilateral lesions to the junction between the parietal and occipital lobes. Here, perception is limited to a single object without awareness of the presence of other stimuli. Thus, being able to see only one object at a time, a patient may collide with various objects in a room being unaware of them. Additionally, objects in motion appear more difficult to perceive.

=== Ventral simultanagnosia ===
Ventral simultanagnosia results from damage to the left inferior occipito-temporal junction. Ventral simultanagnosic patients are able to see several objects at once, but their recognition of objects is piecemeal, or limited to one object at a time. Thus, individuals with ventral simultanagnosic symptoms are capable of navigating through a room without bumping into furniture.

== Causes ==
Simultanagnosia results from bilateral lesions to the junction between the parietal and occipital lobes. These lesions could result from a stroke or traumatic brain injury. It is also possible for simultanagnosic symptoms to develop from degenerative disorders. For example, one study found that four patients with progressive dementia eventually developed symptoms of simultanagnosia as well as components of Gerstmann's syndrome and transcortical sensory aphasia. In addition, patients with Huntington's disease have been found to exhibit visual impairments similar to those of simultanagnosia.

== Proposed theories for mechanism of action ==
It is likely that damage to any of several cognitive mechanisms could result in simultanagnosia. Several theories have been proposed to account for simultanagnosic symptoms, and while some focus on the disruption of a specific process, such as the speed of attentional processing, others focus on the disruption of a representational structure.

=== Restricted visual attention ===
In 1909, Rezső Bálint published one of the earliest descriptions of simultanagnosia. He studied a patient who easily identified single objects, regardless of size, but claimed that he could only see one object when presented with a complex display of numerous items. This patient also exhibited ocular apraxia, an impairment of voluntary eye movements despite intact oculomotor reflexes, and optic ataxia, or the impairment of visually guided hand movements. This collection of symptoms would later be called Bálint's syndrome. Because the size of the object did not affect his patient's ability to perceive an item, Bálint argued that his patient did not have a narrowing of the sensory field. Therefore, Bálint concluded that the patient's attention would always be as narrow as the size of the item being observed. In other words, the attentional window of a simultanagnosic patient is limited to one object.

In contrast to Bálint's hypothesis, Thaiss and De Bleser studied a patient who had a physical restriction of her attentional window. The patient's ability to perceive multiple objects and identify global structures significantly improved as the size of the presented image decreased. Thus, complex stimuli could be processed as wholes so long as they occupied a small visual angle.

=== Disengagement difficulty ===
Another theory to account for simultanagnosia involves deficits in "attentional disengaging," and this impairment affects shifts of attention in any direction. When confronted with several objects, the patient's attention becomes "locked" onto one object, and he has difficulty disengaging his attention from this object to another one. As a result of this "sticky fixation," patients with simultanagnosia can perceive only one object at a time.

=== Slowed visual attention ===
Other studies have proposed that simultanagnosia results from slowed attentional processing. According to this view, attention is seen as filter through which one percept at a time passes, and the speed with which an individual's attention can filter percepts is much slower for a patient with simultanagnosia than a person without the disorder. People without simultanagnosia are able to perceive numerous objects at once because they can shift their attention rapidly enough between stimuli so that percepts are integrated before they decay from short-term memory. However, those with simultanagnosia are incapable of shifting their attention quickly enough from one object to another, and thus, they only perceive one object at a time.

In one study patients were required to read one word and then read a second word that followed the first in rapid succession. While individuals could identify the first word relatively quickly, they had significantly greater difficulty identifying the second word. Furthermore, if the second word was shown after a long delay following the first word, identification of the second word was easier. These results indicate that patients with simultanagnosia have difficulty processing objects presented in rapid succession, and the patient is unable to shift his attention rapidly enough between successive stimuli since a certain amount of time is required for the patient to shift his attention from the first word in order to be able to identify the second word.

=== Spatial mapping deficits ===
It is also possible that impairments in mechanisms that register spatial locations lead to simultanagnosia. According to the feature-integration theory of attention, features of the visual scene, such as color and orientation, are registered early and in parallel across the visual field. These features are represented by separate maps that are later integrated to form a master map of locations that specifies where things are but not what they are. In order to identify objects, focused attention is required to bind perceptual representations of objects being viewed with features in their proper locations. Parietal lesions damage the master map of locations, and as a result, a variety of deficits can occur, including simultanagnosia. If space is necessary to distinguish objects, then deficits in explicit access to spatial information located in the master map leads to the inability to perceive more than one object at a time.

One study developed a computer model of high-level visual processing, which contrasts with low-level visual processing in that it involves the use of previously stored information to identify objects and navigate. When the spatiotopic mapping subsystem of the model was partially damaged, simultanagnosic symptoms resulted. In the model simulation of simultanagnosia, the same location was assigned to all stimuli, therefore preventing the model from identifying multiple objects at once. Either the model "locked" onto the first object and was unable to disengage attention, or once recognition of the first object was completed, it "disappeared" from sight to be replaced by the second object.

Coslett and Saffran studied one patient who was unable to maintain location information for more than one shape. Since only a single explicit binding could occur between spatial and shape information, the patient was incapable of perceiving more than one object at a time.

=== Deficient pattern analysis ===
Another theory to account for simultanagnosia states that patients have difficulty analyzing shapes.

Bilateral lesions to the parieto-occipital junction may cause the ventral circuit to slow down; as a result, patients with simultanagnosia have difficulty discriminating among visual features. According to this theory, "feature degradation" or increased "noise" occurs in the perceptual system. One study analyzed how well patients could process targets based on a feature salient from the background; it found that processing of targets was significantly impaired even though the targets were markedly different from the background. The results suggest that impairments in parsing, such as the process by which important regions are extracted from the retinal image, or difficulty in discriminating elementary visual features led to simultanagnosia.

=== Spatial indexing deficits ===
Finally, simultanagnosia may result from deficits in spatial indexing. Several studies have noted that a pre-attentive stage of processing exists during which visual features are obtained from the visual field in parallel. Once these features have been extracted, they can be indexed, which allows them to function as anchor points for additional visual routines; visual routines are sequences of elemental operations, such as visual search or texture segregation, which define the spatial relationships among objects as well as their properties.

Saliency of a feature facilitates the ease with which it can be indexed. For example, the greater the difference between a specific feature and surrounding ones, the more easily it can be indexed. The indexed features, or anchor points, can serve as a "spotlight" that directs focal attention to certain objects, which can then channel visual information to specialized systems for space and shape analysis. Deficits in the spatial indexing mechanism would result in symptoms of simultanagnosia because interpretation of a complex scene requires rapid shifting of attention to various elements, and impairments in spatial indexing lead to the inability to index multiple visual features rapidly. In addition, perception is slowed, and low-level visual processing is disrupted since the patient would not be able to extract and index salient features.

== Treatment ==
Currently, there is no treatment available for patients with dorsal simultanagnosia, and it is likely that the bilateral lesions resulting in simultanagnosia will not heal. However, a recent study demonstrated that recovery may be related to finding ways to expand the restricted attentional window—their global gestalt perception—that characterizes the disorder. In another study a participant showed an improvement 18 months after stroke induced ventral simultanagnosia, this "represents the usual partial recovery from an early ventral simultanagnosia/pure alexia".

== See also ==
- Agnosia
