= Rezső Bálint (physician) =

Jewish-Hungarian physician (1874–1929)

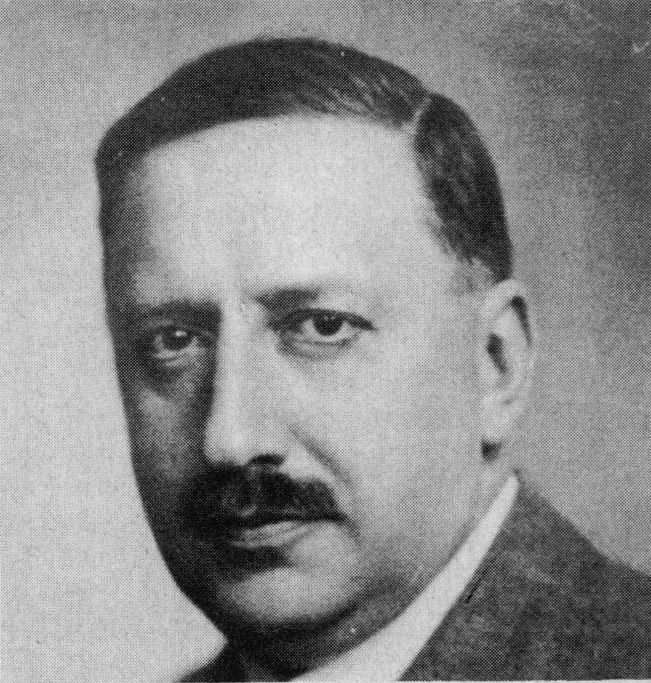
- Born: 22 October 1874; Budapest
- Died: 23 May 1929 (aged 54); Budapest
- Education: University of Budapest
- Known for: Bálint's syndrome
- Scientific career
- Fields: neurology, internal medicine
- Workplaces: University of Budapest

Rezső Bálint (October 22, 1874 – May 23, 1929) was a Hungarian neurologist and psychiatrist. He discovered Bálint's syndrome.

He was born into a German-Jewish family that had settled in Budapest. Rezso Balint’s first writings, published while he was still a medical student, were case studies examining muscular atrophy in hemiplegia. He went on to study tabes dorsalis and the treatment of epilepsy. In 1907, Dr. Balint recorded his observations of a patient who suffered from a unique constellation of neurologic symptoms including fixation of gaze, neglect of objects in his periphery, and misreaching for target objects. The patient was noted to first experience these symptoms following damage to the posterior parietal lobes. This “triple-syndrome complex” was later named “Balint’s Syndrome.”

Bálint studied medicine in Budapest, graduating in 1897. He habilitated in 1910, became extraordinary professor in 1914 and full professor in 1917. He died of thyroid cancer in 1929.

== Selected works ==
- Ueber das Verhalten der Patellarreflexe bei hohen Querschnittsmyelitiden, 1901
- Seelenlähmung des “Schauens”, optische Ataxie, räumliche Störung der Aufmerksamkeit, 1909 doi:10.1159/000210464
- Diaetetikai vezérfonal. Budapest, 1924
- A cukorbetegség és az inzulin. Budapest, 1927
- Ulcusproblem und Säurebasengleichgewicht. Berlin, 1927.
- Gewebsproliferation und Säurebasengleichgewicht. Pathologie und Klinik in Einzeldarstellungen. 1930.
