= Visual extinction =

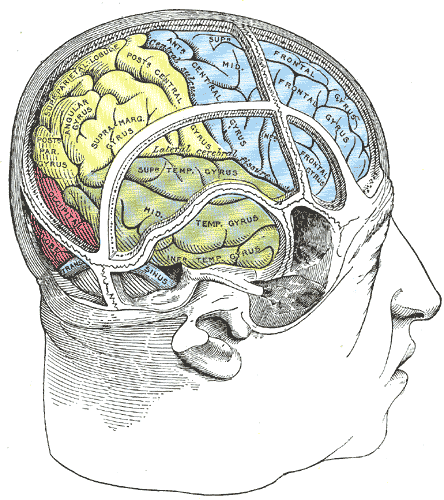
Illustration showing the position of the parietal lobe of the brain, the site of damage related to visual extinction.

Visual extinction is a neurological disorder which occurs following damage to the parietal lobe of the brain. It is similar to, but distinct from, hemispatial neglect. Visual extinction has the characteristic symptom of difficulty to perceive contralesional stimuli when presented simultaneously with an ipsilesional stimulus, but the ability to correctly identify them when not presented simultaneously. Under simultaneous presentation, the contralesional stimulus is apparently ignored by the patient, or extinguished. This deficiency may lead to difficulty on behalf of the patient with processing the stimuli's 3D position.

== History ==
Visual extinction is the result of unilateral cerebral damage and has always been poorly understood. Researchers have been studying visual extinction in great depth since the 1990s. It has since been commonly associated with damage to the right hemisphere of the brain. Studies have suggested that visual extinction may be a result of sensory imbalance. This imbalance is due to weak or delayed afferent inputs in the hemisphere affected by the extinction.

Research done by Pavlovskaya, Sagi, Soroker and Ring show that visual extinction is dependent on simple stimuli properties. These properties are thought to reflect connectivity constraints during the early steps of visual processing.

== Physiological basis ==
Visual extinction arises from damage to the parietal lobe of the brain. This damage most frequently arises following a stroke or other infarction in that area – however, any traumatic event sufficient to cause widespread tissue damage in the area may cause sufficient harm. Although both sides of the brain are vulnerable to such damage, it is more unusual for extinction to occur when the left hemisphere is damaged than the right.

When presented with simultaneous stimuli, the patient will ignore the contralesional stimuli, and only report the ipsilesional. Their ability to report the stimuli correctly when presented singly indicates that this is not a problem with vision per se. This bias against contralesional stimuli is evident even when patients are presented with two signals within the ipsilesional visual field, whose processing remains intact following the damage, since it is done in the opposite brain hemisphere. This implies that extinction can be somewhat controlled by biasing the point of visual fixation contralesionally, such that all relevant stimuli are contained within the functioning side of the visual field, findings supported in experiment

Fatigue and habituation effects have previously been connected to visual extinction; experiments such as those done by Vuilleumier and Rafal eliminate the connection of these effects with visual extinction.

Historically, it was believed that the parietal damage weakened afferent neuron input to the visual cortex, and so the extinction event was caused by the signals originating in the contralesional field being lost during transmission. However, this does not account for the ability of extinction patients being able to correctly identify contralesional stimuli in isolation. A more current theory is called the "race theory."

Race theory holds that stimuli are competing for processing power within the brain. Following parietal damage, all contralesional messages are lowered in priority for the brain's processing in some way – potentially by signal transmission delay – such that when presented with alternative stimuli, the contralesional stimulus doesn't arrive at the decision center simultaneously with the ipsilesional stimulus, and thus is denied conscious processing.

The race theory sees some support in findings by Marzi et al., where patients who show extinction also display aggravated delays in their reaction time to stimuli, both when compared to patients who have other forms of right-brain damage and undamaged patients. In the study, patients were shown to be able to focus their attention and improve reaction time, but still have subnormal performance. This theory is given further support by Gorea and Sagi's inducing of extinction-like events in undamaged patients when presented with simultaneous stimuli of different intensities, with the lower intensity stimulus being extinguished by the mere presence of the high intensity stimulus.

Extinction frequency may also be affected by reporting method, due to how visual processing interacts with the rest of the brain. Reported extinctions drop when the patient is told to relay the extinction news by a method other than speaking – particularly, the use of the eyes in a feedback loop (looking to the side if there is a single stimuli, and up if there are two). This may work by eliminating the need for hemispheric transfer of information – routing the response to the motor cortex instead of the visual cortex – and so shortening the path and response time, a conclusion supported by increased detection of isolated contralesional stimuli under such circumstances.

Although extinction is compared with hemispatial neglect, the two are different disorders. It is possible to exhibit one without the other, and the neural basis for each appears to be different, hemispatial neglect arising from tempo-parietal junction damage. Although patients may exhibit these disorders simultaneously, this occurs in less than half of the affected population.

== Characteristics ==
- When measuring the ERP of the right parietal lobe during extinction events, EEGs do not display the P1 or N1 waves otherwise evidenced in healthy bilateral response.
- When presented with stimuli, eye saccades from fixation point are more common in extinction patients, are longer in duration, and show ipsilesional bias in movement.
- Some evidence for a slight increase in detection of eccentric stimuli in the ipsilesional visual field – i.e. slightly improved peripheral vision.
- Patients show increased difference in reaction time (crossed-uncrossed difference) for processing in contralesional and ipsilesional visual hemispheres.

== Diagnosis ==
Diagnosis is achieved through several related methods. One approach involves having patients sit in front of a computer screen, on which either stars or triangles are projected simultaneously in different areas of the screen. Patients are then asked to identify the locations and identities of the shapes. Another similar approach is to project colored letters on the screen, again asking patients to identify the letter and color in different parts of the screen. From this information, a diagnosis of visual extinction can be attained. A positive diagnosis results from a patient's inability to correctly identify shapes or letters projected simultaneously in different areas of the screen. However, the most common test for visual extinction is the finger confrontation model. In this test, the doctor asks the patient to note which of his hands have moving fingers. This can be used immediately following a stroke, for the doctor's quick diagnosis.

== Treatment ==
Without any sort of treatment, visual extinction usually worsens in severity of symptoms or remains completely stagnant. Simple exercises, such as reading and copying tasks, can be useful in treating the symptoms and increasing brain activity, though the damaged area can never be completely healed since the dead brain cells do not regenerate. An individual should keep up with exercises designed to maintain or improve function in order to create the best chance of improvement and/or maintenance at his or her current state.

Treatment methods for patients who have visual extinction generally involve use and training of an individual's vision. A doctor may instruct a patient to scan rows of lights in different ways in an attempt to regenerate function. Some light boards do exist that are used specifically to aid this task. Other methods exist that are designed to force the patient to focus on multiple stimuli at the same time. These cueing and scanning methods do yield results, but they are not consistent across all patients. In successful cases, generally forty hours of retraining the patients' vision were necessary as well as some additional work done at home with similar exercises.

Other computer scanning methods of treatment were shown to be effective with specialized equipment designed specifically for scanning and cueing exercises to force patients to focus on multiple stimuli simultaneously. Again, the results of these methods were not consistent, but in laboratory settings rehabilitation was successful. Of the individuals who recovered some function, not all maintained the function they recovered, losing it after about five months.

In another, single-stimulus rehabilitatory approach, the patient is shown a computer screen with a box in each corner and a fixation cross at the center. When a stimulus appears in any of the boxes, the patient is instructed to indicate seeing it as quickly as possible. This task is eased somewhat by an indicating icon before the stimulus – either an arrow that points to the box the stimulus is most likely (but not guaranteed) to be in, or a cross to indicate that the stimulus could appear in any box. Following thirty hour-long sessions, patients demonstrated a significant decrease in both extinction and hemispatial neglect.

In patients whose brain damage was in the right hemisphere, left limb activation (LLA) was another treatment that proved effective. The theory behind this method of treatment is that any use of the damaged side of the brain will enhance all functions related to the damaged hemisphere and that use of the opposite (healthy) side will only cause further impairment. LLA therefore is merely the concentrated use of the left side of the body in patients whose damage is in the right hemisphere (since the right hemisphere controls the left side of the body). This forces the patient to exercise spatial awareness using the damaged side of the brain, increasing activity around the lesion. While generally a treatment used for visual neglect (a different but related neurological disorder), LLA still increases brain activity around damaged area in patients with visual extinction and generates improvement in some patients. The reason this treatment does not work in some cases of visual extinction is that damage can be on either side of the brain as opposed to in visual neglect where the damage is always on the right.

== Society & Culture ==
This condition does not inhibit patients from social interaction. In fact, most people would not be able to distinguish a visual extinction patient from a non-visual extinction patient in passing. Patients have selective spatial interactions, typically within the range of six degrees of the angle of vision. When two visual stimuli are presented to a patient, they can be processed as a single object due to the corresponding neuronal functions which are linked through long-range lateral interactions. Visual Extinction is often mistaken for attentional deficit. Some researchers believe visual extinction may be connected to a restriction in attention capacity. Attention allows a person to identify and react to pertinent objects in space, while ignoring other irrelevant objects. Patients with visual extinction, especially those with unilateral damage to the right parietal lobe, may be unable to attend and orient to objects in collateral space, therefore presenting neglect to visual stimuli.

A delay in reaction time is observed in many patients, but it is unknown whether this is a primary result of the stroke or resulting from the visual extinction. Detrimental social aspects may be repercussions of the stroke, which caused the visual extinction, but not from the visual extinction condition alone.

== Visual Extinction and Image Preprocessing ==
Visual extinction has been involved in several studies regarding preprocessing of images in the brain. A study performed by Dr Vuilleumier examined the effect of using faces as the stimulus in studying an extinction event. Subjects were presented with two simultaneous stimuli – some combination of a schematic face, a shape, a word, and a scrambled face. Faces in the contralesional field were less likely to be extinguished than other stimuli, but faces in the ipsilesional field appeared to induce more extinction events. The appearance of a face was prioritized in attention, despite the handicap presented of extinction damage.

Visual extinction has also been used to demonstrate brain bias towards gestalt processing. When presented with a figure containing illusory contours, patients were able to correctly report the presence of stimuli in both contralesional and ipsilesional hemispheres, due to their unconscious processing of the whole field to produce the illusion. This experiment implied that the attention center prioritizes the visualization of surfaces over other stimuli – therefore, although under race model the ipsilesional stimuli should extinguish the contralesional, the creation of the gestalt takes priority over detection of both. Further, a study using Gabor signals (alternating blurred and noisy black and white bars, commonly used by opticians in diagnostic tests) investigated how the orientation of these signals affected their extinction rate. Bilateral stimuli were least extinguished when both stimuli were oriented horizontally, although both stimuli being oriented vertically also showed a reduction in extinguishing rate when compared to one stimulus vertical and one horizontal – in what could be assumed by the brain to represent two different surfaces.

Combining the brain bias towards facial processing and surface discovery, a follow-up study by Dr. Vuilleumier exposed subjects to paired visual stimuli in three phases. In the initial phase, stimuli were simply bilateral pairs, and extinction frequency was measured. In the next stage, the stimuli were surrounded with an oval, so that they appeared to represent eyes in a face. The extinction rate for this appearance was greatly reduced. Finally, the patients were shown the stimuli minus the contextual oval – however, the reduced extinction rate persisted, as though the patients had learned to group these stimuli. The effect did not occur when the stimuli were surrounded by a nonoval shape, pointing towards facial processing as being the key to this phenomenon.

Visual feedback has also been studied in relation to visual extinction. Patients were asked to touch a known target in a darkened room. A light attached to the patient's hand was sometimes briefly illuminated, to provide information about where the hand was in relation to the target. In some of these trials, a distracting light was also lit, which induced an extinction event in the patient. Although the patient reported in such cases that he had not seen the indicator light on his hand, their performance was correspondingly better, similar to the results when visual feedback had been available. Although the patient was not cognizant of having received the information, they were able to correctly act upon it, in a manner similar to blindsight.

Visual extinction has also been researched with regard to the effect of repetition on visual detection rate. Patients were shown a colored (red or green) letter (O or E), one to each visual field, and then asked variably to report the color or shape of one letter or the other. Extinction was found to be increased in the contralesional field when the patient was asked to report on a repeated characteristic – if both stimuli had been the same shape, or same color – regardless of whether the other characteristic had also been changed. This is another example of repetition blindness.

== Future & Research ==
Researchers conduct studies involving first-episode stroke patients. These patients typically have unilateral cerebral damage and/or contralateral extinction. Current research is focusing on the more detailed role of the parietal lobe in visual extinction.

The ability to understand which factors in visual processing determine whether a contralesional event, occurring on the half of the patient's brain or body opposing the site of a lesion, is observed or eliminated can provide crucial insights connecting to the mechanisms of attention and operation.

Routine eye examinations have begun to incorporate the knowledge of visual extinction. Such examinations screen for simple, unsuspected visual field defects or abnormalities, while screening for the more severe extinction, by testing all quadrants of the visual field.
