= Lotze =

Lotze is a surname. Notable people with the surname include:

- Hermann Lotze (1817–1881), German philosopher and logician
- Hiltrud Lotze (born 1958), German politician

== See also ==
- Lotte (name)
