= Tectopulvinar pathway =

The tectopulvinar pathway and the geniculostriate pathway are the two visual pathways that travel from the retina to the early visual cortical areas. From the optic tract, the tectopulvinar pathway sends neuronal radiations to the superior colliculus in the tectum, then to the lateral posterior-pulvinar thalamic complex. Approximately 10% of retinal ganglion cells (mostly magnocellular) project onto the tectopulvinar pathway.

The tectopulvinar pathway is a phylogenetically older pathway than the geniculostriate pathway, and is the only visual pathway present in fish, amphibians, and reptiles. The tectopulvinar pathway terminates at the prestriate cortex (also known as the extrastriate cortex or visual area V2), which receives large feedforward input from the striate cortex; the geniculostriate pathway also converges to the same location. . At the thalamic pulvinar nucleus, visual information is routed either to the medial pulvinar, which sends connections to cingulate, posterior parietal, premotor and prefrontal cortical areas; or to the lateral pulvinar, which sends connections to the temporal lobe dorsal stream cortical areas (and in particular, to region MT – a critical region for motion perception).

Damage to the tectopulvinar pathway is most commonly characterized by visual ataxia, a deficit characterized by an inability to perform visually guided hand movements in reaching and grasping objects, as well as by spatial attentional deficits.

== Function ==
The tectopulvinar pathway is a fast-acting pathway that provides the viewer with information on the absolute spatial information of objects. The pathway plays a large role in directing visual spatial attention and is particularly responsive to novel stimuli that appear or move in peripheral vision; however, because it receives mostly magnocellular visual input, the tectopulvinar pathway is not sensitive to fine detail. It directs visual spatial attention most notably through guided eye movements, via cranial nerves III ( the oculomotor nerve), IV ( the trochlear nerve), and VI (the abducens nerve). Directing visual spatial attention and eye movements to salient peripheral stimuli is necessary to bring likely important visual information to center vision. Furthermore, the tectopulvinar pathway has been suggested to support residual visual perceptual abilities in blindsight patients.

=== Superior Colliculus ===
Within the pathway, the superior colliculus functions to orient the viewer’s gaze and attention via eye and head movements towards objects of interest in egocentric space. The superior colliculus’s role in directing eye movements is especially well-studied: multiple lines of evidence show that artificially blocking and increasing superior colliculus activity modulates (inhibits and biases, respectively) eye saccades to the affected side. Recent evidence has argued that superior colliculus function is not limited to basic motor and low-level visual control, but more generally in target selection and in both covert and overt attentional control. Further studies contend that superior colliculus function encompasses a wide range of behavioral responses such as in arm-reaching, and not just in eye and head movements.

The superior colliculus is also a center for multisensory auditory and visual integration. Recent studies have shown that the superior colliculus responds especially strongly when auditory input arrives temporally and synchronously with visual input. Superior colliculus activity was measured to be greater in these multisensory events than in single modality events

=== Pulvinar Nucleus ===
Further along the pathway, the pulvinar nucleus performs similar tasks to the superior colliculus in directing visual spatial attention. Pulvinar lesions often create visuomotor deficits and neglect-like attentional deficits. Lastly, the pulvinar nucleus has been implicated in guiding attention for behavioral responses: greater neuronal activity was recorded for stimuli that serve as targets or cues for active behavior than for stimuli that are not associated with active behavior.
