= Paleothalamus =

Obsolete term for part of the thalamus

The paleothalamus is an obsolete term for the portion of the thalamus that is believed to be phylogenetically (or evolutionarily) older than other parts of the thalamus. Specifically, the midline and medial nuclei of the thalamus, as well as the intralaminar nucleus, are considered to belong to the paleothalamus

The term "paleothalamus" is opposed to the paired term neothalamus (also considered to be obsolete), which designates the phylogenetically (or evolutionarily) newer or younger parts of the thalamus, specifically, lateral nuclei of the thalamus, the pulvinar and the geniculate bodies.

Initially, the paleothalamus was distinguished from other parts of the thalamus (i.e. from the neothalamus) on the basis that paleothalamic nuclei were believed to lack reciprocal connections with neocortex (isocortex), unlike neothalamic nuclei, which have manifold reciprocal connections to the neocortex. Today it is known that thalamic nuclei which were previously termed "paleothalamic" also have such reciprocal connections with neocortex. This was the main reason why the terms "paleothalamus" and "neothalamus" were felt obsolete and fell into disfavor.
