= STK6 =

STK6 may refer to:

- Aurora A kinase, an enzyme
- Myosin-heavy-chain kinase, an enzyme
