= Compartment (development) =

Development

In developmental biology, compartments can be simply defined as separate, different, adjacent cell populations, which upon juxtaposition, create a lineage boundary. This boundary prevents cell movement from cells from different lineages across this barrier, restricting them to their compartment. Subdivisions are established by morphogen gradients and maintained by local cell-cell interactions, providing functional units with domains of different regulatory genes, which give rise to distinct fates. Compartment boundaries are found across species. In the hindbrain of vertebrate embryos, rhombomeres are compartments of common lineage outlined by expression of Hox genes. In invertebrates, the wing imaginal disc of Drosophila provides an excellent model for the study of compartments. Although other tissues, such as the abdomen, and even other imaginal discs are compartmentalized, much of our understanding of key concepts and molecular mechanisms involved in compartment boundaries has been derived from experimentation in the wing disc of the fruit fly.

== Function ==
By separating different cell populations, the fate of these compartments are highly organized and regulated. In addition, this separation creates a region of specialized cells close to the boundary, which serves as a signaling center for the patterning, polarizing and proliferation of the entire disc. Compartment boundaries establish these organizing centers by providing the source of morphogens that are responsible for the positional information required for development and regeneration. The inability of cell competition to occur across the boundary, indicates that each compartment serves as an autonomous unit of growth. Differences in growth rates and patterns in each compartment, maintain the two lineages separated and each control the precise size of the imaginal discs.

== Cell separation ==
These two cell populations are kept separate by a mechanism of cell segregation linked to the heritable expression of a selector gene. A selector gene is one that is expressed in one group of cells but not the other, giving the founder cells and their descendants different instructions. Eventually these selector genes become fixed in either an expressed or unexpressed state and are stably inherited to the descendants, specifying the identity of the compartment and preventing these genetically different cell populations from intermixing. Therefore, these selector genes are key for the formation and maintenance of lineage compartments.

== Central dogma ==
The difference in selector gene activity not only establishes two compartments, but also leads to the formation of a boundary between these two that serves as a source of morphogen gradients. In the central dogma of compartments, first, morphogen gradients position founder compartment cells. Then, active/inactive selector genes give a unique genetic identity to cells within a compartment, instructing their fate and their interactions with the neighboring compartment. Finally, border cells, established by short-range signaling from one compartment to its neighboring compartment emit long-range signals that spread to both compartments to regulate the growth and pattering of the entire tissue.

== A/P boundary ==
In 1970, by means of clonal analysis, the Anterior-Posterior boundary was identified. The founder cells, found at the border between parasegments 4 and 5 of embryo, are already determined at the early blastoderm stage and defined into the two populations they will generate by stripes of the engrailed gene. The selector gene, engrailed (en), is a key determinant in boundary formation between the anterior and posterior compartments. As the wing imaginal disc expands, posterior, but not anterior cells will express engrailed and maintain this expression state as they expand and form the disc. Engrailed mutant clones of posterior origin will gain anterior affinity and move towards the anterior compartment and intermix with those cells. Within the posterior compartment these clones will sort out and form an ectopic border where they meet other posterior cells. Similarly, a clone of anterior cells expressing engrailed will gain posterior identity and create an ectopic boundary where the clone meets other anterior cells in this compartment. In addition, to its cell autonomous role in specifying posterior compartment identity, engrailed also has a non-cell autonomous function in the general growth and patterning of the wing disc, through the activation of signaling pathways such as Hedgehog (Hh) and Decapentaplegic (Dpp). The presence of engrailed in the posterior cells leads to the secretion of the short-range inducer Hh which can cross over to the anterior compartment to activate the long-range morphogen, Dpp. Cells in the posterior compartment produce Hh, but only anterior cells can transduce the signal. Optomotor-blind (omb) is involved in the transcriptional response of Dpp, which is only required in the anterior cells to interpret Hh signaling for boundary formation and maintenance. In addition, Cubitus interruptus (Ci), the signal transducer of the Hh signal, is expressed throughout the anterior compartment, particularly in anterior border cells. In posterior cells engrailed prevents the expression of Ci, such it is only expressed in anterior cells and hence only these cells can respond to Hh signaling by up-regulating the expression of dpp. Loss of engrailed function in posterior cells, results in anterior transformation, where Hh expression is decreased and dpp, ci and patched (ptc) is increased, resulting in the formation of a new A/P boundary, suggesting that en positively regulates hh, while negatively regulating ci, ptc and dpp.

== Cell segregation ==
To explain how anterior and posterior cells are kept separated, the differential adhesion hypothesis proposes that these two cell populations express different adhesion molecules, producing different affinities for each other that minimize their contact. The selector affinity model proposes that difference in cell affinity between compartments is a result of differential selector gene expression. The presence or absence of selector genes in a given compartment produces compartment-specific adhesion or recognition molecules that are different from those in its counterpart. For example, engrailed expressed in the posterior, but not the anterior, cells provides the differential affinity that keeps these compartments separately. It is also possible that this difference in cell adhesion/affinity is not directly due to en expression, but rather to the ability to receive Hh signaling. Anterior cells, capable of Hh transduction, will express given adhesive molecules that would differ from those present in posterior cells, creating differential affinity that would prevent them from intermixing. This signaling-affinity model is supported by experiments that demonstrate the importance of Hh signaling. Clones mutant for the Smoothened (smo), the gene responsible for transducing Hh signaling, retain anterior-like features, but move into the posterior compartment without any changes in the expression engrailed or invected. This demonstrates that Hh signaling, rather than the absence of en, is what gives cells their compartmental identity. Nonetheless, this signaling-affinity model is incomplete: smo mutant clones of anterior origin that migrate into the posterior compartment, do not completely associate with these cells, but rather form a smooth boundary with these posterior cells. If signaling-affinity were the only factor determining compartment identity, then these clones, which are no longer receiving Hh signaling, would have the same affinity as the other posterior cells in that compartment and be able to intermix with them. These experiments indicate that although Hh signaling could be having an effect in adhesive properties, this effect is limited to the border cells rather than throughout both compartments. It is also possible that both compartments produce the same cell adhesion molecules, but a difference in its abundance or activity could result in sorting between the two compartments. In vitro, transfected cells with high levels of a given adhesion molecule will segregate from cells that expressing lower levels of this same molecule. Finally, differences in cell bond tension could also play a role in the establishment of the boundary and the separation of the two different cell populations. Experimental data has shown that Myosin-II is up-regulated along both the dorsal-ventral and anterior-posterior boundaries in the imaginal wing disc. The D/V boundary is characterized by the presence of filamentous actin and mutations in Myosin-II heavy chain impairs D/V compartmentalization. Similarly, both F-actin and Myosin-II are increased along the A/P boundary, accompanied by a decrease of Bazooka, which was also observed in the D/V border. The Rho-kinase inhibitor Y-27632, of which Myosin-II is the main target, significantly reduces cell bond tension, suggesting that Myosin-II could be the main effector of this process. In support of the signaling-affinity model, creating an artificial interface between cells with active vs. inactive Hh signaling induces a junctional behavior that aligns the cell bonds of where these opposing cell types meet. Moreover, a 2.5-fold increase in mechanical tension is observed along the A/P boundary, compared to the rest of the tissue. Simulations using a vertex model demonstrate that this increase in cell bond tension is enough to maintain proliferating cell populations in separate compartment boundaries. Parameters used to measure cell bond tension are based cell-cell adhesion and cortical tension input. It has also been suggested that boundary formation is not a result of differential mechanical tension between the two cell populations, but could be a result of the mechanical properties of the boundary itself. The level the adhesion molecule, E-cadherin, was unaltered and the biophysical properties of cells between the two compartments were the same. Changes in cell properties, such as an enlarged apical cross-section area, are only observed in anterior and posterior border cells. Along the boundary, orientation of cell divisions was random and there is no evidence that increased cell death or zones of non-proliferating cells are important for maintaining the A/P or D/V boundary.

== Future directions ==
Despite many attempts to identify the adhesion molecules important for the establishment and maintenance of compartment boundaries, none have been identified. Continuation of our understanding of this process will benefit from further experimental data on cell bonds and cortical tension, as well as screens to identify molecules regulating differential cell affinity.
