= Thalamus =

Structure within the brain

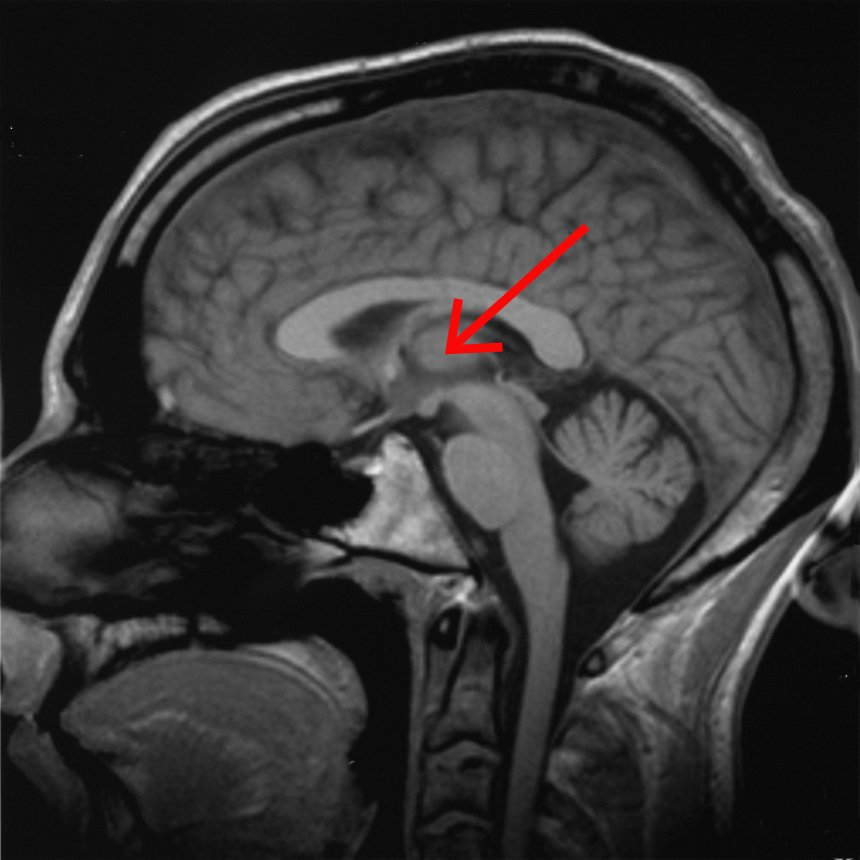
- Thalamus marked (MRI cross-section)

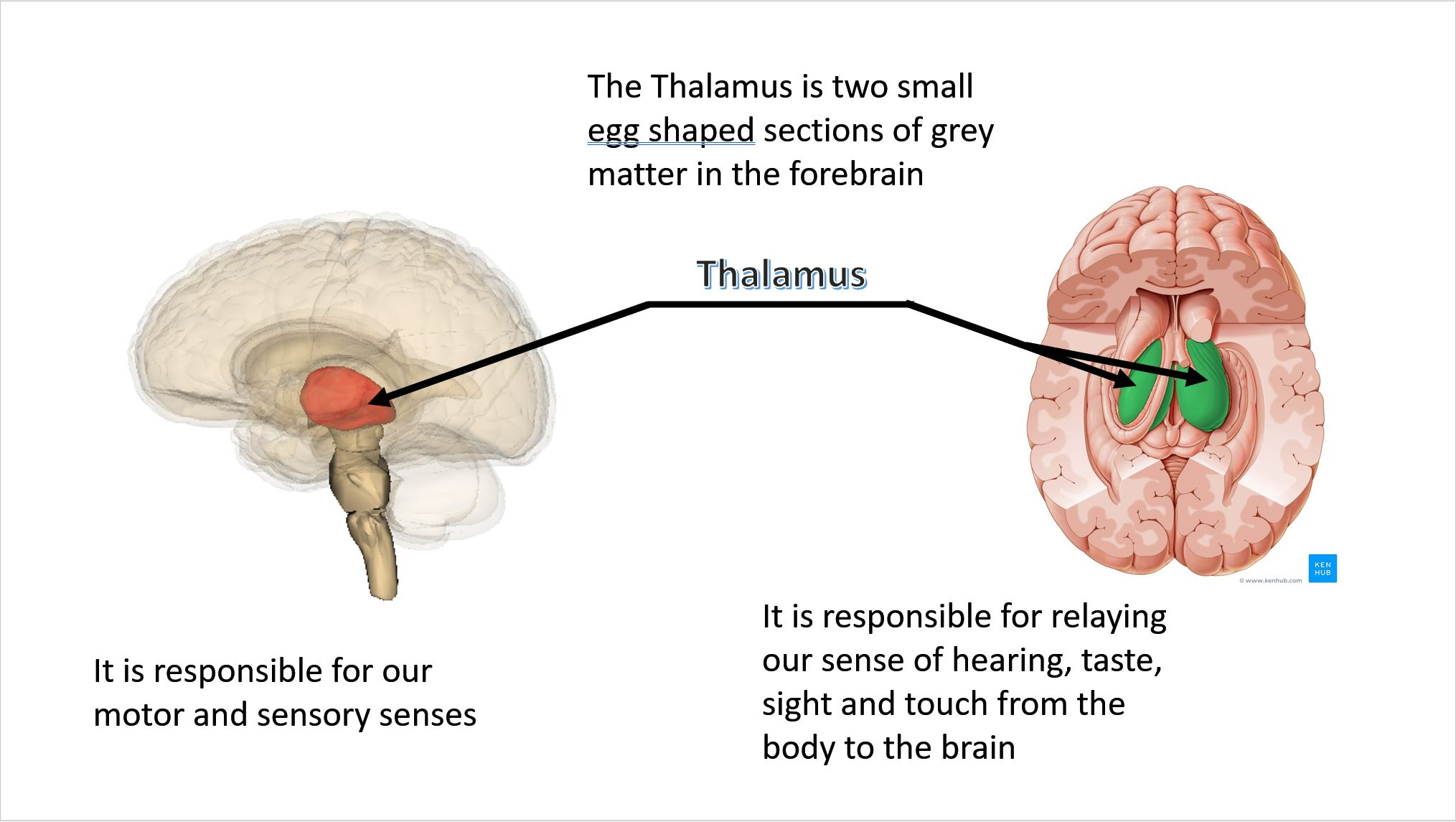
- Visual depiction of basic thalamus

Details
- Part of: Diencephalon
- Parts: See List of thalamic nuclei
- Artery: Posterior cerebral artery and branches

Identifiers
- Latin: thalamus dorsalis
- MeSH: D013788
- NeuroNames: 300
- NeuroLex ID: birnlex_954
- TA98: A14.1.08.101; A14.1.08.601
- TA2: 5678
- TE: E5.14.3.4.2.1.8
- FMA: 62007

The thalamus (pl.: thalami; from Greek θάλαμος, "chamber") is a large mass of gray matter on the lateral wall of the third ventricle forming the dorsal part of the diencephalon (a division of the forebrain). Nerve fibers project out of the thalamus to the cerebral cortex in all directions, known as the thalamocortical radiations, allowing hub-like exchanges of information. It has several functions, such as the relaying of sensory and motor signals to the cerebral cortex and the regulation of consciousness, sleep, and alertness.

Anatomically, the thalami are paramedian symmetrical structures (left and right), within the vertebrate brain, situated between the cerebral cortex and the midbrain. It forms during embryonic development as the main product of the diencephalon, as first recognized by the Swiss embryologist and anatomist Wilhelm His Sr. in 1893.

== Anatomy ==
The thalami are paired structures of gray matter about four centimetres long and ovoid in appearance, located in the forebrain which is superior to the midbrain, near the center of the brain with nerve fibers projecting out to the cerebral cortex in all directions. In fact, almost all thalamic neurons (with the notable exception of the thalamic reticular nucleus) project to the cerebral cortex, and every region of the cortex so far studied has been found to innervate the thalamus.

Each of the thalami may be subdivided into at least 30 nuclei, giving a total of at least 60 for the 'whole thalamus'.

Estimates of the volume of the 'whole thalamus' vary. A post-mortem study of 10 people with average age 71 years found average volume 13.68 cm${}^3$. In an MRI study of 12 healthy males with average age 17 years, scans showed mean 'whole thalamus' volume 8.68cm${}^3$.

The medial surface of the thalamus constitutes the upper part of the lateral wall of the third ventricle, and is connected to the corresponding surface of the opposite thalamus by a flattened gray band, the interthalamic adhesion.

The lateral part of the thalamus is the neothalamus, the phylogenetically newest part of the thalamus, which includes the lateral nuclei, the pulvinar nuclei and the medial and lateral geniculate nuclei.

The surface of the thalamus is covered by two layers of white matter, the stratum zonale covers the dorsal surface, and the external medullary lamina covers the lateral surface. (This stratum zonale should not be confused with the stratum zonale of the superior colliculus.) The grey matter of thalamus is partitioned by a Y shaped internal medullary lamina which divides the nuclei into anterior, medial, and lateral groups.

Derivatives of the diencephalon include the dorsally located epithalamus (essentially the habenula and annexes) and the peri-thalamus (pre-thalamus) containing the zona incerta and the thalamic reticular nucleus. Due to their different ontogenetic origins, the epithalamus and the peri-thalamus are formally distinguished from the thalamus proper. The metathalamus is made up of the lateral geniculate and medial geniculate nuclei.

The thalamus comprises a system of lamellae (made up of myelinated fibers) that separate different thalamic subparts. Other areas are defined by distinct clusters of neurons, such as the periventricular nucleus, the intralaminar elements, the "nucleus limitans", and others. These latter structures, different in structure from the major part of the thalamus, have been grouped together into the allothalamus as opposed to the isothalamus. This distinction simplifies the global description of the thalamus.

Thalamic nuclei. Metathalamus labelled MTh. (Left thalamus viewed from left.)

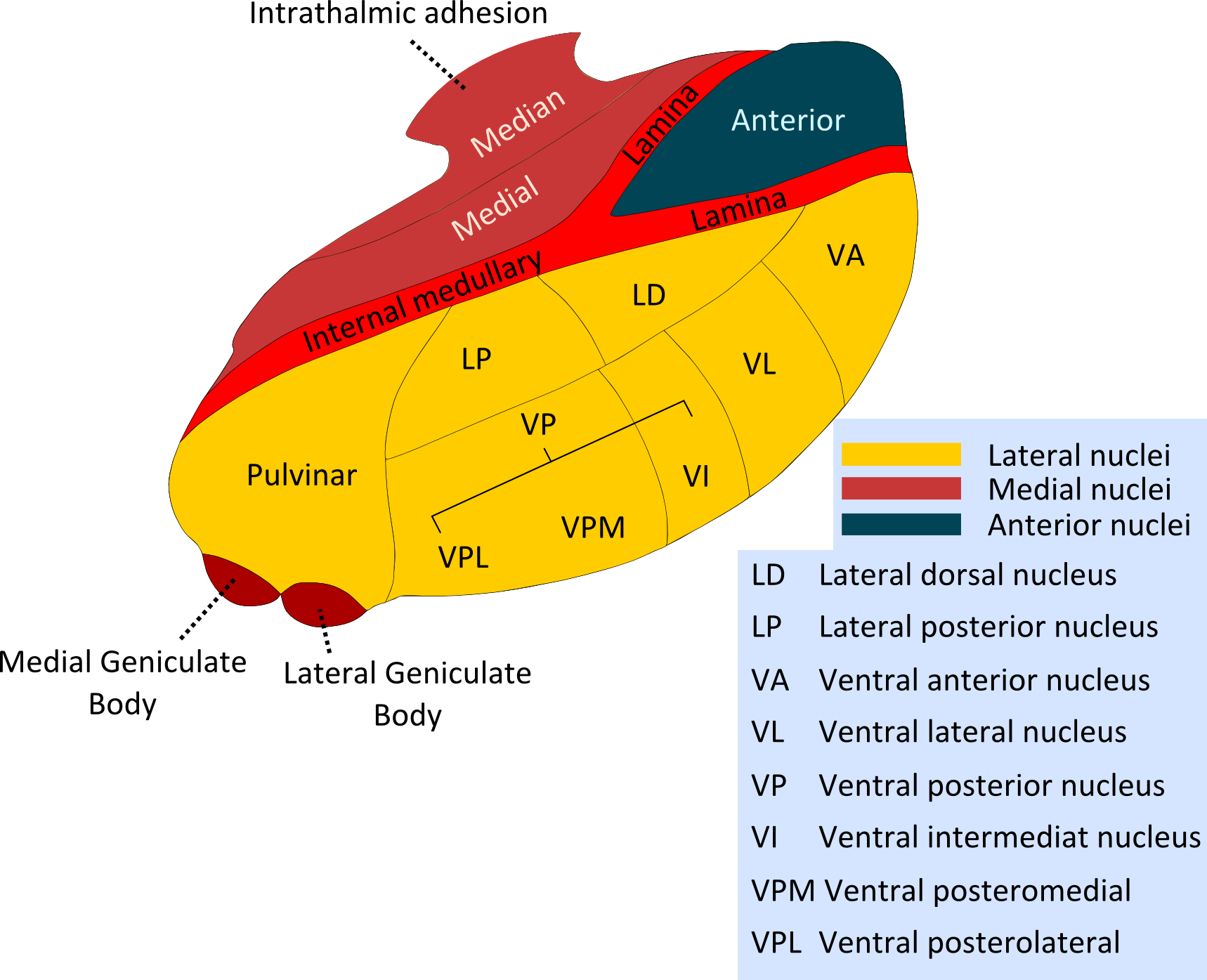
Nuclei of right thalamus (viewed from above right)

=== Thalamic nuclei ===
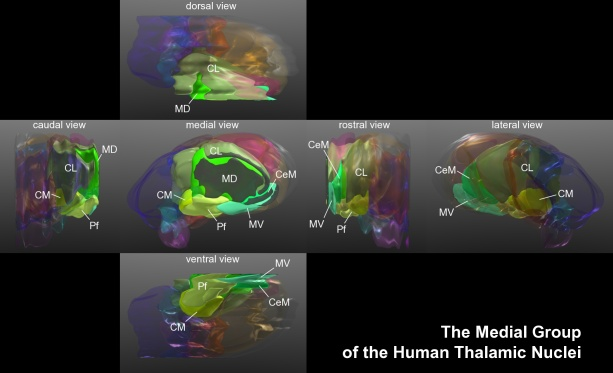
Medial nuclei of the left thalamus. Key: CeM Central Medial. CL Central Lateral. CM CentroMedian. MD Medial Dorsal. MV MedioVentral Reuniens. Pf Parafascicular. (Lateral view shows sagittal section through left thalamus)

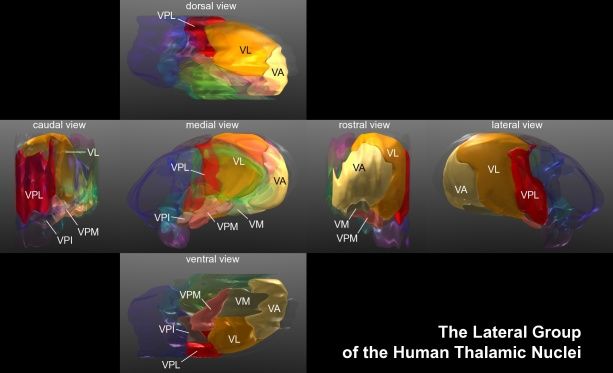
Lateral nuclei of the left thalamus. Key: VA Ventral Anterior. VL Ventral Lateral. VM Ventral Medial. VPI Ventral PosteroInferior. VPL Ventral PosteroLateral. VPM Ventral PosteroMedial. (Medial view shows sagittal section through left thalamus.)

The principal subdivision of the thalamus into nucleus groups is the trisection of each thalamus (left and right) by a Y-shaped internal medullary lamina. This trisection divides each thalamus into anterior, medial and lateral groups of nuclei. The medial group is subdivided into the medial dorsal nucleus and midline group. The lateral group is subdivided into ventral, pulvinar, lateral dorsal, lateral posterior and metathalamus. The ventral group is further subdivided into ventral anterior, ventral lateral and ventral posterior.

The interior medullary lamina is subdivided into intralaminar nuclei. Additional structures are the reticular nucleus (which envelops the lateral thalamus), the stratum zonale, and the interthalamic adhesion.

Combining these division principles yields the following hierarchy, which is subject to many further subdivisions.

- anterior group
- medial group
  - medial dorsal nucleus
  - midline group
- lateral group
  - ventral group
    - ventral anterior group
    - ventral lateral group
    - ventral posterior group
  - pulvinar group
  - lateral dorsal nucleus
  - lateral posterior nucleus
  - metathalamus
    - lateral geniculate nucleus
    - medial geniculate nucleus
- intralaminar group
- reticular nucleus
- stratum zonale
- interthalamic adhesion

The term "lateral nuclear group" is used with two meanings. It can mean either the complete set of nuclei in the lateral "third" of the trisection by the lamina, or the subset which excludes the ventral group and the geniculate nuclei.

=== Blood supply ===
The thalamus derives its blood supply from a number of arteries: the polar artery (posterior communicating artery), paramedian thalamic-subthalamic arteries, inferolateral (thalamogeniculate) arteries, and posterior (medial and lateral) choroidal arteries. These are all branches of the posterior cerebral artery.

Some people have the artery of Percheron, which is a rare anatomic variation in which a single arterial trunk arises from the posterior cerebral artery to supply both parts of the thalamus.

=== Connections ===
The thalamus is connected to the spinal cord via the spinothalamic tract

The thalamus has many connections to the hippocampus via the mammillothalamic tract. This tract comprises the mammillary bodies and fornix.

The thalamus is connected to the cerebral cortex via the thalamocortical radiations.

The spinothalamic tract is a sensory pathway originating in the spinal cord. It transmits information to the thalamus about pain, temperature, itch and crude touch. There are two main parts: the lateral spinothalamic tract, which transmits pain and temperature, and the anterior (or ventral) spinothalamic tract, which transmits crude touch and pressure.

== Function ==
The thalamus has multiple functions, and is generally believed to act as a relay station, or hub, relaying information between different subcortical areas and the cerebral cortex. In particular, every sensory system (with the exception of the olfactory system) includes a thalamic nucleus that receives sensory signals and sends them to the associated primary cortical area.

For the visual system, for example, inputs from the retina are sent to the lateral geniculate nucleus of the thalamus, which in turn projects to the visual cortex in the occipital lobe. Similarly the medial geniculate nucleus acts as a key auditory relay between the inferior colliculus of the midbrain and the primary auditory cortex. The ventral posterior nucleus is a key somatosensory relay, which sends touch and proprioceptive information to the primary somatosensory cortex. In rodents, proprioceptive information of head and whisker movements is integrated already at the thalamic level.

The thalamus is believed to both process sensory information as well as relay it—each of the primary sensory relay areas receives strong feedback connections from the cerebral cortex.

The thalamus also plays an important role in regulating states of sleep and wakefulness. Thalamic nuclei have strong reciprocal connections with the cerebral cortex, forming thalamo-cortico-thalamic circuits that are believed to be involved with consciousness. The thalamus plays a major role in regulating arousal, the level of awareness, and activity. Damage to the thalamus can lead to permanent coma.

The role of the thalamus in the more anterior pallidal and nigral territories in the basal ganglia system disturbances is recognized but still poorly understood. The contribution of the thalamus to vestibular or to tectal functions is almost ignored. The thalamus has been thought of as a "relay" that simply forwards signals to the cerebral cortex. Newer research suggests that thalamic function is more selective. Many different functions are linked to various regions of the thalamus. This is the case for many of the sensory systems (except for the olfactory system), such as the auditory, somatic, visceral, gustatory and visual systems where localized lesions provoke specific sensory deficits. A major role of the thalamus is support of motor and language systems, and much of the circuitry implicated for these systems is shared.

The thalamus is functionally connected to the hippocampus as part of the extended hippocampal system at the thalamic anterior nuclei. With respect to spatial memory and spatial sensory datum they are crucial for human episodic event memory. The thalamic region's connection to the medial temporal lobe provides differentiation of the functioning of recollective and familiarity memory.

The neuronal information processes necessary for motor control were proposed as a network involving the thalamus as a subcortical motor center. Through investigations of the anatomy of the brains of primates the nature of the interconnected tissues of the cerebellum to the multiple motor cortices suggested that the thalamus fulfills a key function in providing the specific channels from the basal ganglia and cerebellum to the cortical motor areas. In an investigation of the saccade and antisaccade motor response in three monkeys, the thalamic regions were found to be involved in the generation of antisaccade eye-movement (that is, the ability to inhibit the reflexive ballistic movement of the eyes in the direction of a presented stimulus).

Recent research suggests that the mediodorsal thalamus (MD) may play a broader role in cognition. Specifically, the mediodorsal thalamus may "amplify the connectivity (signaling strength) of just the circuits in the cortex appropriate for the current context and thereby contribute to the flexibility (of the mammalian brain) to make complex decisions by wiring the many associations on which decisions depend into weakly connected cortical circuits." Researchers found that "enhancing MD activity magnified the ability of mice to "think," driving down by more than 25 percent their error rate in deciding which conflicting sensory stimuli to follow to find the reward."

== Development ==
The thalamic complex is composed of the perithalamus (or prethalamus, previously also known as ventral thalamus), the mid-diencephalic organiser (which forms later the zona limitans intrathalamica (ZLI) ) and the thalamus (dorsal thalamus). The development of the thalamus can be subdivided into three steps. The thalamus is the largest structure deriving from the embryonic diencephalon, the posterior part of the forebrain situated between the midbrain and the cerebrum.

=== Early brain development ===
After neurulation, the early developmental stage (primordium) of the prethalamus and the thalamus is induced within the neural tube. Data from different vertebrate model organisms support a model in which the interaction between two transcription factors, Fez and Otx, is of decisive importance. Fez is expressed in the prethalamus, and functional experiments show that Fez is required for prethalamus formation. Posteriorly, OTX1 and OTX2 abut the expression domain of Fez and are required for proper development of the thalamus.

=== Formation of progenitor domains ===
Early in thalamic development two progenitor domains form, a caudal domain, and a rostral domain. The caudal domain gives rise to all of the glutamatergic neurons in the adult thalamus while the rostral domain gives rise to all of the GABAergic neurons in the adult thalamus.

=== The formation of the mid-diencephalic organiser (MDO) ===
At the interface between the expression domains of Fez and Otx, the mid-diencephalic organizer (MDO, also called the ZLI organiser) is induced within the thalamic anlage. The MDO is the central signalling organizer in the thalamus. A lack of the organizer leads to the absence of the thalamus. The MDO matures from ventral to dorsal during development. Members of the sonic hedgehog (SHH) family and of the Wnt family are the main principal signals emitted by the MDO.

Besides its importance as signalling center, the organizer matures into the morphological structure of the zona limitans intrathalamica (ZLI).

=== Maturation and parcellation of the thalamus ===
After its induction, the MDO starts to orchestrate the development of the thalamic anlage by release of signalling molecules such as SHH. In mice, the function of signaling at the MDO has not been addressed directly due to a complete absence of the diencephalon in SHH mutants.

Studies in chicks have shown that SHH is both necessary and sufficient for thalamic gene induction. In zebrafish, it was shown that the expression of two SHH genes, SHH-a and SHH-b (formerly described as twhh) mark the MDO territory, and that SHH signaling is sufficient for the molecular differentiation of both the prethalamus and the thalamus but is not required for their maintenance and SHH signaling from the MDO/alar plate is sufficient for the maturation of prethalamic and thalamic territory while ventral Shh signals are dispensable.

The exposure to SHH leads to differentiation of thalamic neurons. SHH signaling from the MDO induces a posterior-to-anterior wave of expression the proneural gene Neurogenin1 in the major (caudal) part of the thalamus, and Ascl1 (formerly Mash1) in the remaining narrow stripe of rostral thalamic cells immediately adjacent to the MDO, and in the prethalamus.

This zonation of proneural gene expression leads to the differentiation of glutamatergic relay neurons from the Neurogenin1+ precursors and of GABAergic inhibitory neurons from the Ascl1+ precursors. In fish, selection of these alternative neurotransmitter fates is controlled by the dynamic expression of Her6 the homolog of HES1. Expression of this hairy-like bHLH transcription factor, which represses Neurogenin but is required for Ascl1, is progressively lost from the caudal thalamus but maintained in the prethalamus and in the stripe of rostral thalamic cells. In addition, studies on chick and mice have shown that blocking the Shh pathway leads to absence of the rostral thalamus and substantial decrease of the caudal thalamus. The rostral thalamus will give rise to the reticular nucleus mainly whereby the caudal thalamus will form the relay thalamus and will be further subdivided in the thalamic nuclei.

In humans, a common genetic variation in the promoter region of the serotonin transporter (the SERT-long and -short allele: 5-HTTLPR) has been shown to affect the development of several regions of the thalamus in adults. People who inherit two short alleles (SERT-ss) have more neurons and a larger volume in the pulvinar and possibly the limbic regions of the thalamus. Enlargement of the thalamus provides an anatomical basis for why people who inherit two SERT-ss alleles are more vulnerable to major depression, post-traumatic stress disorder, and suicide.

== Clinical significance ==
A thalamus damaged by a stroke can lead to thalamic pain syndrome, which involves a one-sided burning or aching sensation often accompanied by mood swings. Bilateral ischemia of the area supplied by the paramedian artery can cause serious problems including akinetic mutism, and be accompanied by oculomotor problems. A related concept is thalamocortical dysrhythmia. The occlusion of the artery of Percheron can lead to a bilateral thalamus infarction.

Korsakoff syndrome stems from damage to the mammillary body, the mammillothalamic fasciculus or the thalamus.

Fatal familial insomnia is a hereditary prion disease in which degeneration of the thalamus occurs, causing the patient to gradually lose their ability to sleep and progressing to a state of total insomnia, which invariably leads to death. In contrast, damage to the thalamus can result in coma.

Atrophy of the thalamus is an indicator of the start of multiple sclerosis. Thalamic volume loss by atrophy, is also significantly shown in sporadic frontotemporal dementia, noted in the anterior-dorsal thickness.

Microstimulation of the posterior portion of the ventral medial thalamic nucleus can be used to evoke pain, temperature and visceral sensations.

Conjoined twins Krista and Tatiana Hogan have a unique thalamic connection that may provide insight into the philosophical and neurological foundations of consciousness. It has been argued that there's no empirical test that can conclusively establish that for some sensations, the twins share one token experience rather than two exactly matching token experiences. Yet background considerations about the way the brain has specific locations for conscious contents, combined with the evident overlapping pathways in the twins' brains, arguably implies that the twins share some conscious experiences. If this is true, then the twins may offer a proof of concept for how experiences in general could be shared between brains.

== History ==
The importance of the thalamus as a sensory relay was first recognized by Edouard Fournie in 1873, through a series of toxin injections in cats.

== Additional images ==
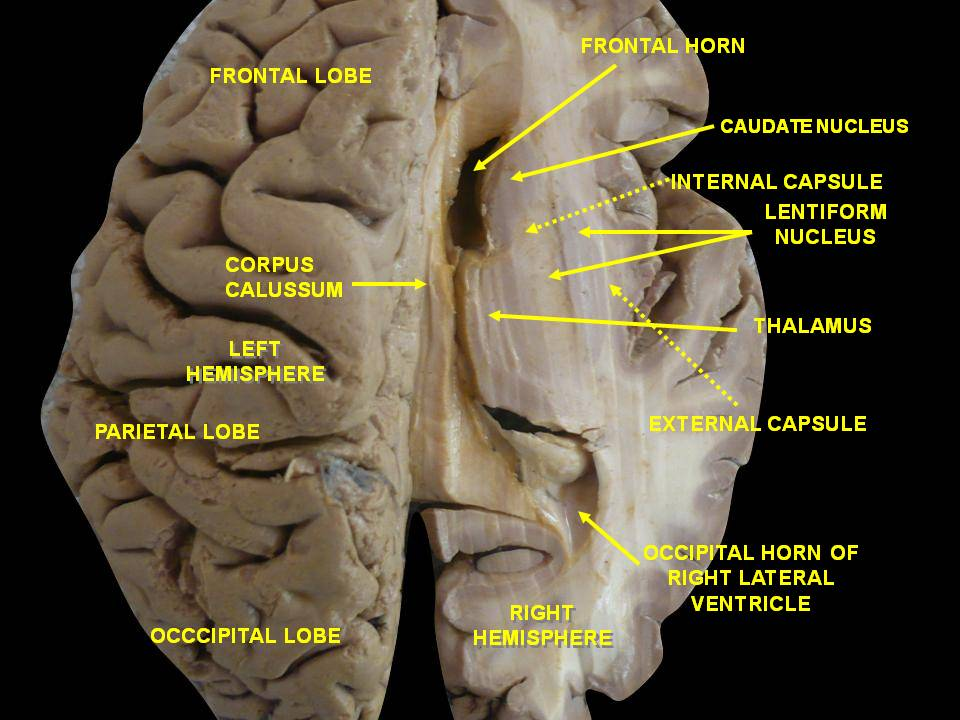
Human brain dissection, showing the thalamus.
(View from above.)

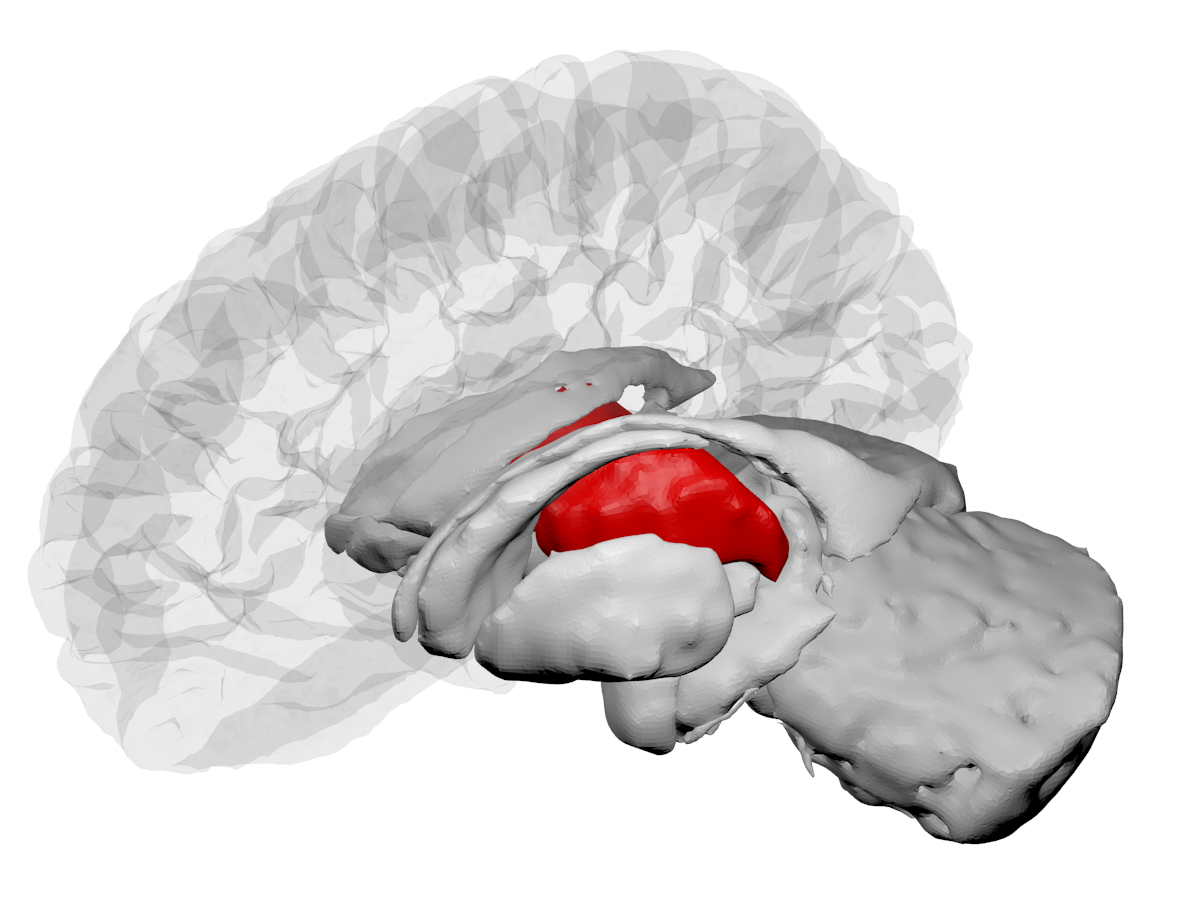
Human thalamus along with other subcortical structures, in glass brain.

The thalamus in a 360° rotation

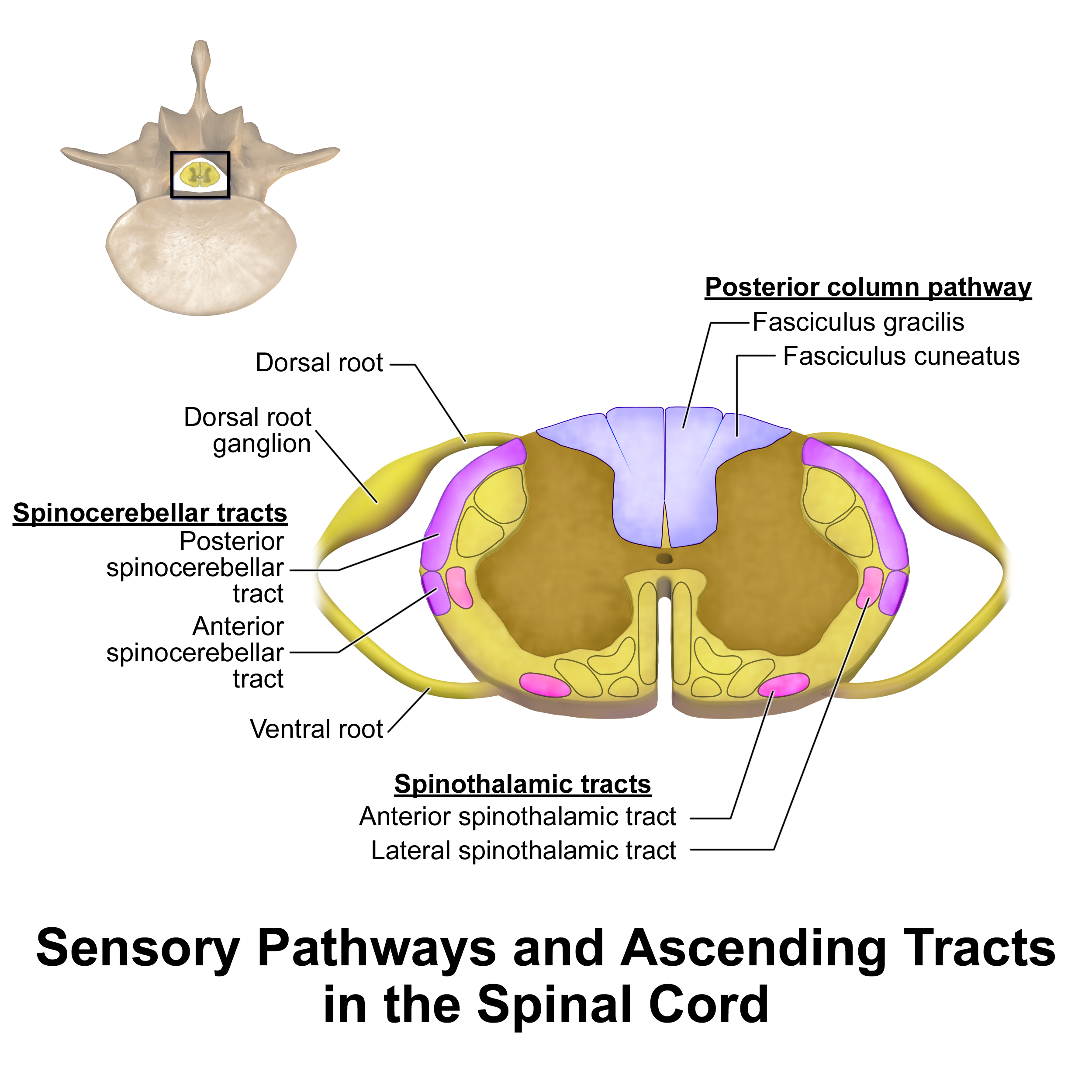
Diagram showing the anterior and lateral spinothalamic tracts within the spinal cord

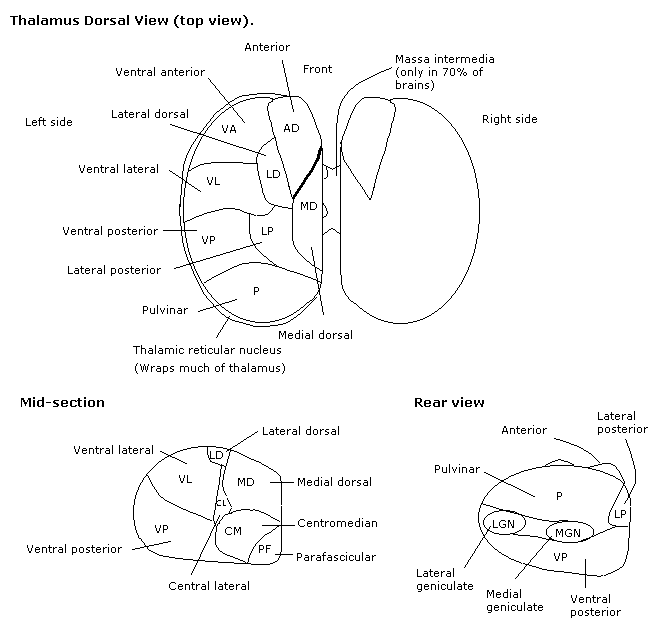
Dorsal view

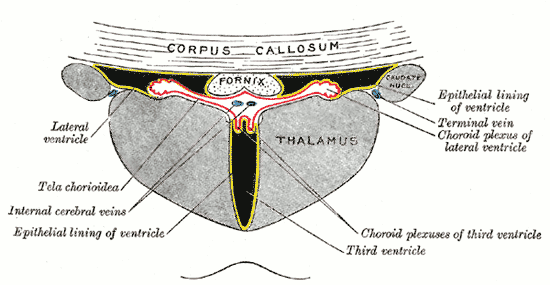
Coronal section of lateral and third ventricles

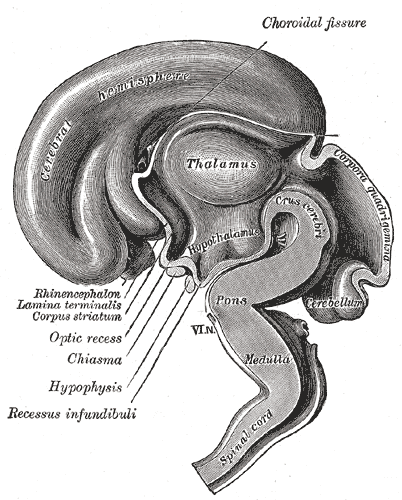
Median sagittal section of brain of human embryo of three months

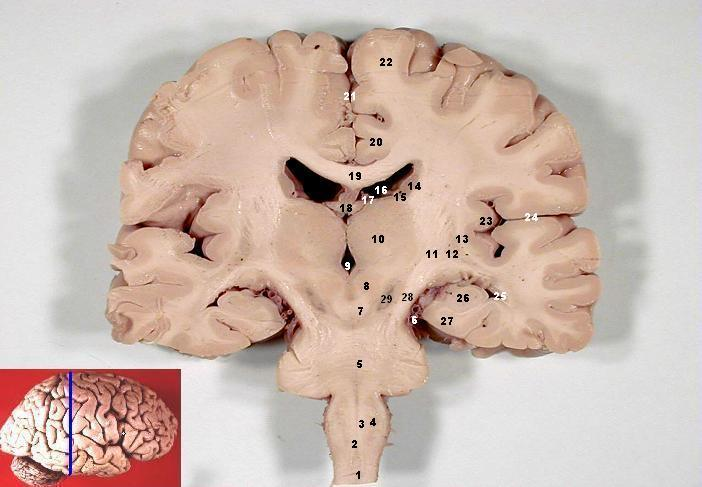
Human brain frontal (coronal) section. Thalamus label is 10.

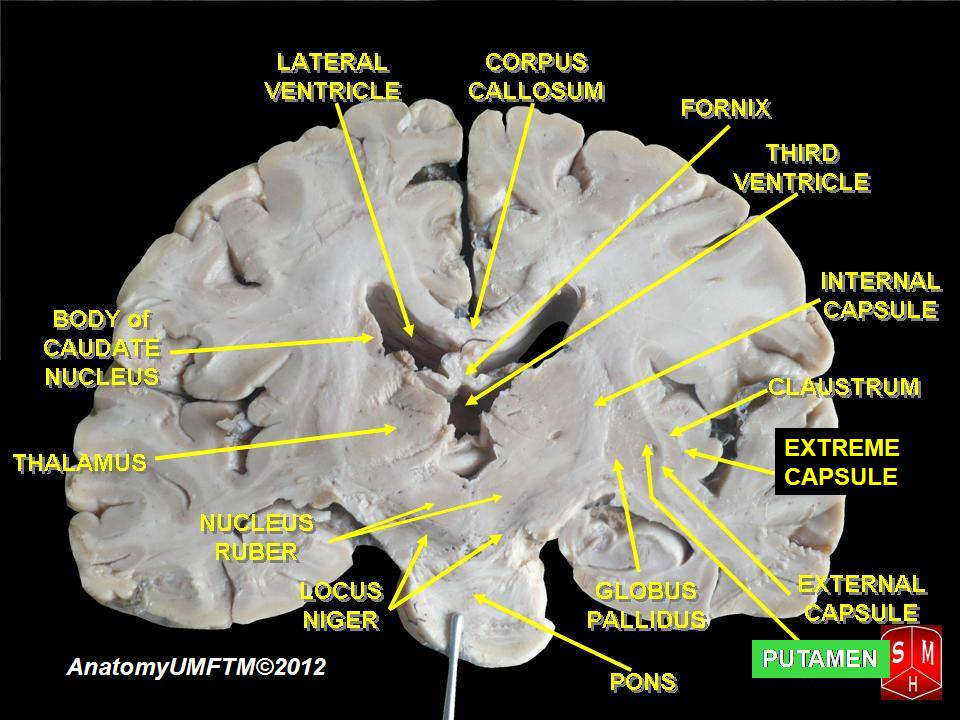
Thalamus coronal section

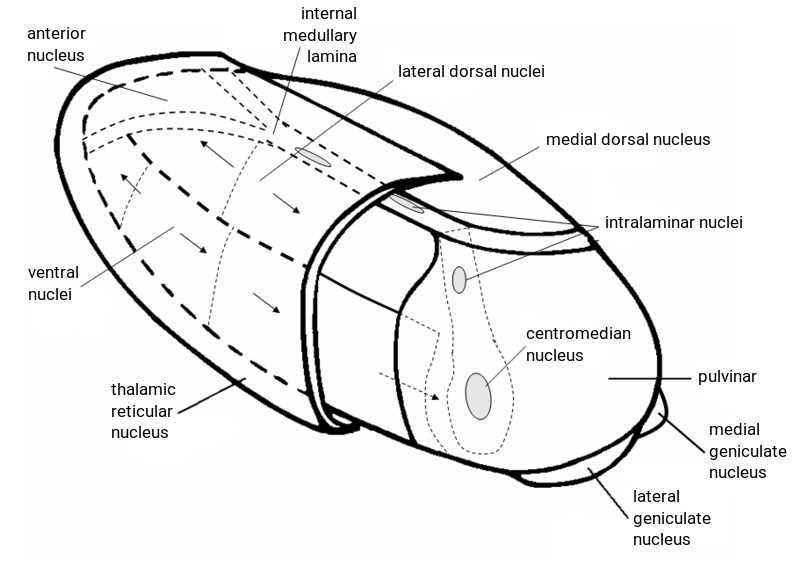
Left thalamus viewed from left dorsal posterior

== See also ==
- 5-HT7 receptor
- Krista and Tatiana Hogan - conjoined twins with joined thalami
- Nonmotor region of the ventral nuclear group of the thalamus
- Nucleus ventralis posterior lateralis pars oralis (VPLo), a region of the thalamus
- Thalamic stimulator
- Thalamotomy
