= Heavy chain =

Heavy chain may refer to:

- Immunoglobulin heavy chain, a subunit of antibodies
  - Heavy-chain antibody, an antibody composed of heavy chains only
  - Heavy chain disease, a disease affecting antibody heavy chain production
- Myosin heavy chain, a subunit of myosin II
  - Myosin-heavy-chain kinase, an enzyme that catalyses the phosphorylation of myosin heavy chains
