= Subthalamus =

Structure of the brain

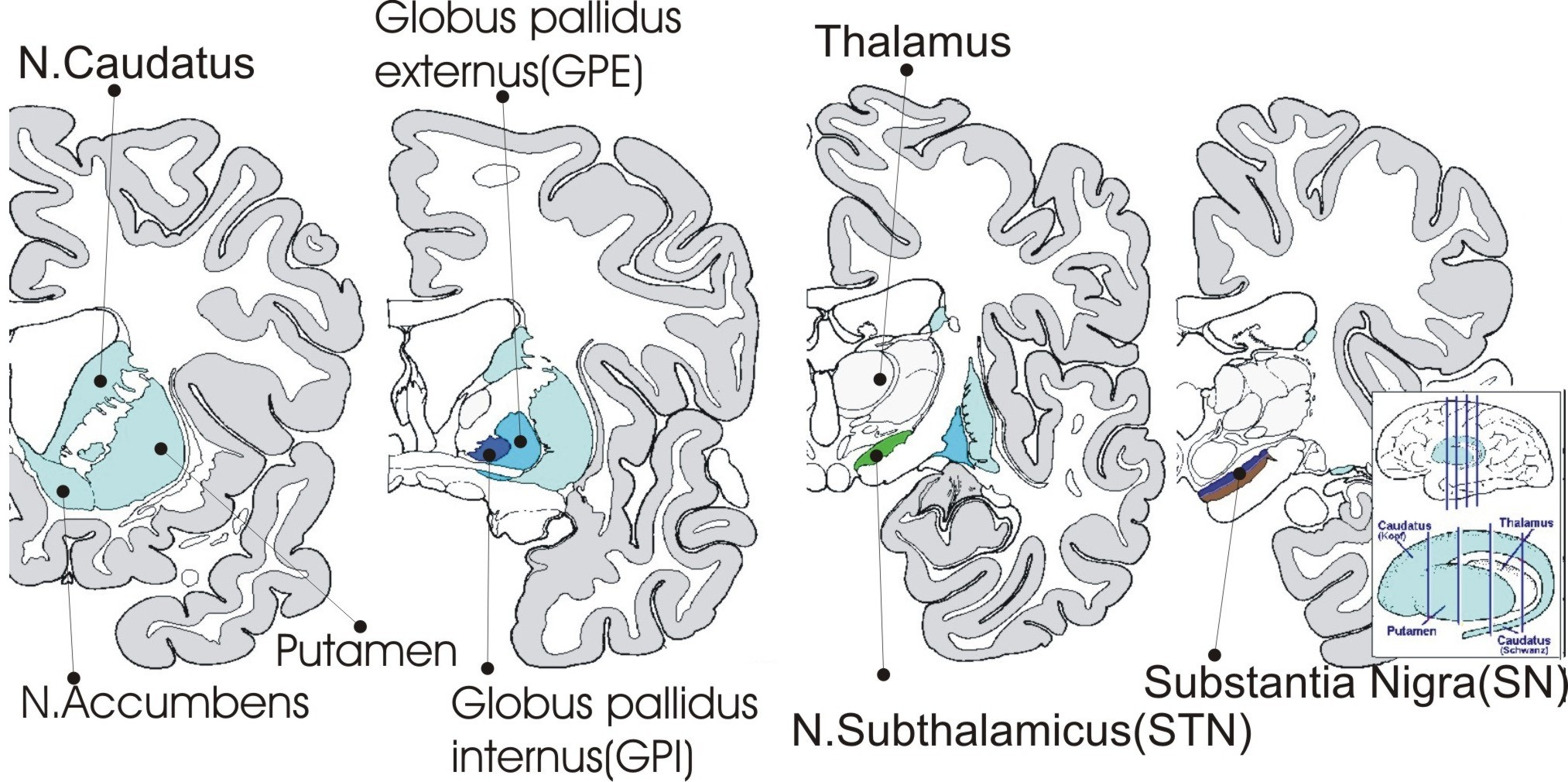
- Coronal slices of human brain showing the basal ganglia, subthalamic nucleus (STN) and substantia nigra (SN). STN is in subthalamus; SN is not.

Identifiers
- MeSH: D020530
- NeuroNames: 434
- NeuroLex ID: birnlex_708
- TA98: A14.1.08.201; A14.1.08.701
- TA2: 5708
- FMA: 62010

The subthalamus or ventral thalamus is a part of the diencephalon. Its most prominent structure is the subthalamic nucleus. The subthalamus connects to the globus pallidus, a subcortical nucleus of the basal ganglia.

== Structure ==
The subthalamus is located ventral to the thalamus, medial to the internal capsule and lateral to the hypothalamus. It is a region formed by several grey matter nuclei and their associated white matter structures, namely:

- The subthalamic nucleus, whose neurons contain glutamate and have excitatory effects over neurons of globus pallidus and substantia nigra
- Zona incerta, located between fields of Forel H_{1} and H_{2}. It is continuous with the thalamic reticular nucleus and receives input from the precentral cortex.
- Subthalamic fasciculus, formed by fibers that connect the globus pallidus with the subthalamic nucleus
- Fields of Forel
- Ansa lenticularis

During development the subthalamus is continuous with the hypothalamus, but is separated by white matter fibres mainly from the internal capsule. Caudally, the subthalamus or prethalamus is separated from the thalamus by the zona limitans intrathalamica.

Postnatally, the subthalamus lies beneath the thalamus, hence 'sub' (meaning below) 'thalamus'. It also lies dorsolateral to the hypothalamus.

== Connections ==
The subthalamus develops efferent (output) connections to the striatum (caudate nucleus and putamen) in the telencephalon, to the dorsal thalamus (medial and lateral nuclear groups) in the diencephalon, and to the red nucleus and substantia nigra in the mesencephalon. It receives afferent (input) connections from the substantia nigra and striatum.
