= L. S. Shashidhara =

Indian biologist

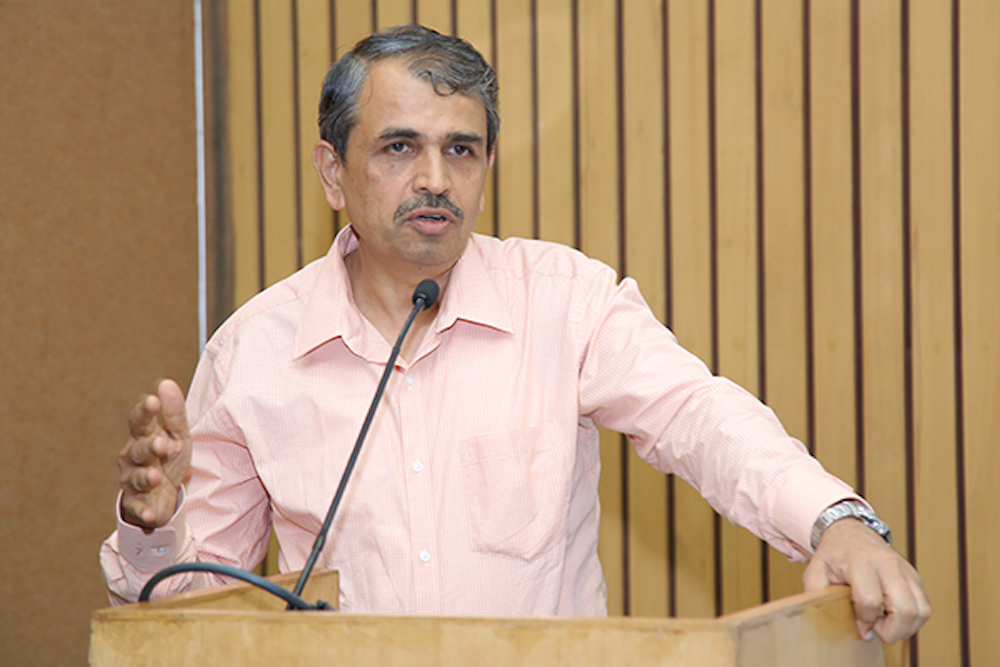
- Shashidhara in 2017
- Born: 23 March 1963 (age 63); Karnataka, India
- Education: University of Agricultural Sciences, Dharwad; University of Cambridge; National Centre for Biological Sciences
- Known for: Studies on Drosophila; Science and Education
- Awards: 2003 CSIR Technology Prize; 2006 DAE-SRC Outstanding Research Investigator Award; 2008 Shanti Swarup Bhatnagar Prize
- Scientific career
- Fields: Genetics; Developmental biology
- Workplaces: Centre for Cellular and Molecular Biology; Indian Institutes of Science Education and Research; Jawaharlal Nehru Centre for Advanced Scientific Research; Ashoka University

Lingadahalli Subrahmanya Shashidhara (born 1963) is an Indian developmental biologist, geneticist and a professor of biology currently serving as the Centre Director of National Centre for Biological Sciences, Bengaluru, India. He was a Professor at the Indian Institute of Science Education and Research, Pune, and at Ashoka University, Sonepat, India. He heads the LSS Laboratory at IISER and is known for his studies on Drosophila, particularly the evolution of appendages and functions of homeotic selector genes. He is a J. C. Bose National Fellow of the Department of Science and Technology and an elected fellow of the Indian National Science Academy, Indian Academy of Sciences and the National Academy of Sciences, India. The Council of Scientific and Industrial Research, the apex agency of the Government of India for scientific research, awarded him the Shanti Swarup Bhatnagar Prize for Science and Technology, one of the highest Indian science awards, in 2008, for his contributions to biological sciences.

In 2018, L.S. Shashidhara was elected an Associate Member of European Molecular Biology Organization (EMBO), making him the third scientist from India to join a group of about 1800 researchers.

L. S. Shashidhara was elected as the president of the International Union of Biological Sciences (IUBS) in the 33rd General Assembly of IUBS held during the Centenary Year Event of IUBS, at Oslo, in 2019. On behalf of IUBS, Shashidhara is steering an international project on Climate Change Education (titled as TROP ICSU). This project is supported by many unions and UN organizations.

== Biography ==
L. S. Shashidhara, born on 23 March 1963 in the south Indian state of Karnataka, graduated in science from University of Agricultural Sciences, Dharwad (UAS) in 1985 and obtained a master's degree in Genetics and Plant breeding in 1987 from the same university. After a brief stint (1987–88) at UAS as a teaching associate, he moved to University of Cambridge in 1988 for his doctoral studies to secure a PhD in 1991. On completion of his post-doctoral studies at Cambridge (1991–93), he returned to India to join National Centre for Biological Sciences and worked as a visiting fellow for two years. Subsequently, he moved to Centre for Cellular and Molecular Biology (CCMB) in 1995 as a scientist (group leader) where he served until 2007 when he was transferred, on deputation, to the Pune centre of Indian Institutes of Science Education and Research (IISER) as a professor. Since then, he has been serving the institute as a professor and has served as the chair of Biology and the coordinator of the department of biology. He pursues his research interests as the head of the LSS Laboratory at IISER, where he hosts a number doctoral and postdoctoral scholars. He also serves as an honorary professor at Jawaharlal Nehru Centre for Advanced Scientific Research. He served as the vice-president of the Indian National Science Academy from 2015 to 2017 and secretary general of the International Union of Biological Sciences from 2015-2019.

== Career ==
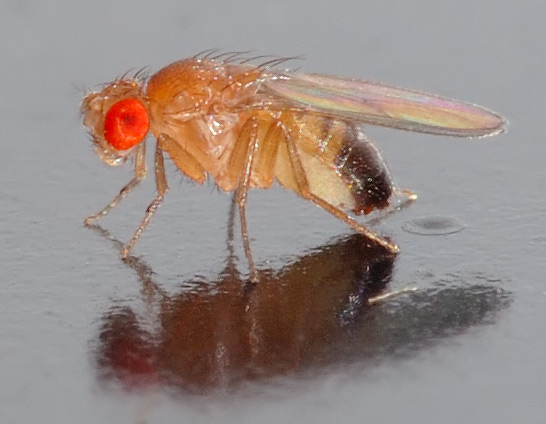
Drosophila melanogaster

Shashidhara's research was focused on developmental biology, specifically the development of limbs and the role played by Ultrabithorax, a Hox gene, functioning as a transcription factor. Studying Drosophila melanogaster (commonly known as fruit fly) as a model, he elucidated the molecular pathways Wnt, TGF-? and EGFR/Ras that impact growth control and developed a fly model for studying Adenomatous polyposis coli, the colon cancer gene in humans. His studies are reported to have assisted in a wider understanding of the relation between genes and diseases in humans and in the development of cancer drug discovery systems. His research findings have been published in a number of articles (Note: 25 of his articles are reported to be high-impact articles) published in peer-reviewed journals, several of them have been listed in online article repositories such as Metascience, PubMed, and ResearchGate. He has also published many general articles and has delivered keynote addresses and featured talks. He served as the secretary-general of the International Union of Biological Sciences (IUBS), during 2015–2019 and is associated with the Journal of Genetics and Current Science as their associate editor and with Scientific Reports as a member of its editorial board.

== Awards and honours ==
Shashidhara, a J. C. Bose National Fellow of the Department of Science and Technology, received the Technology Prize in Biological Sciences of the Council of Scientific and Industrial Research in 2003 and the Outstanding Research Investigator Award of the Science Research Council of the Department of Atomic Energy in 2006. The Indian academy of Sciences elected him as a fellow in 2007 and he became an elected fellow of the Indian National Science Academy and the National Academy of Sciences, India in 2008. The same year he received the Shanti Swarup Bhatnagar Prize of the Council of Scientific and Industrial Research, one of the highest Indian science awards, for his contributions to Biological Sciences. In 2018, L.S. Shashidhara has been elected an Associate Member of European Molecular Biology Organization (EMBO). He is currently elected as the president of International Union Of Biological Sciences.

== Selected bibliography ==
=== Scientific articles ===
- Vaid, Pooja M.; Puntambekar, Anirudha K.; Jumle, Nutan S.; Banale, Rituja A.; Ansari, Danish; Reddy, Ruhi R.; Unde, Rohini R.; Namewar, Namrata P.; Kelkar, Devaki A.; Shashidhara, L. S.; Koppiker, Chaitanyanand B.; Kulkarni, Madhura D. (21 November 2022). "Evaluation of tumor-infiltrating lymphocytes (TILs) in molecular subtypes of an Indian cohort of breast cancer patients". Diagnostic Pathology. 17 (1): 91. doi:10.1186/s13000-022-01271-y. PMC 9677664. PMID 36411483.
- Mave, Vidya; Shaikh, Arsh; Monteiro, Joy Merwin; Bogam, Prasad; Pujari, Bhalchandra S.; Gupte, Nikhil (21 June 2022). "Association of national and regional lockdowns with COVID-19 infection rates in Pune, India". Scientific Reports. 12 (1): 10446. Bibcode:2022NatSR..1210446M. doi:10.1038/s41598-022-14674-0. PMC 9212203. PMID 35729206.
- Bogam, Prasad; Joshi, Aparna; Nagarkar, Sanket; Jain, Divyashri; Gupte, Nikhil; Shashidhara, Ls; Monteiro, Joy Merwin; Mave, Vidya (March 2022). "Burden of COVID-19 and case fatality rate in Pune, India: an analysis of the first and second wave of the pandemic". IJID Regions. 2: 74–81. doi:10.1016/j.ijregi.2021.12.006. PMC 8690685. PMID 35721428. S2CID 235632750.
- Rahman, Ayesha; Shashidhara, Lingadahalli S. (March 2022). "Analyzing the influence of IL18 in regulation of YAP1 in breast oncogenesis using cBioportal". Cancer Reports. 5 (3) e1484. doi:10.1002/cnr2.1484. PMC 8955059. PMID 34196131.
- Chakraborty, Anirban; Kumar, Sumit; Shashidhara, L. S.; Taneja, Anjali (2 July 2021). "Building Sustainable Societies through Purpose-Driven Universities: A Case Study from Ashoka University (India)". Sustainability. 13 (13): 7423. Bibcode:2021Sust...13.7423C. doi:10.3390/su13137423.
- Busheri, Laleh; Dixit, Santosh; Nare, Smeeta; Alhat, Rashmi; Thomas, George; Jagtap, Mangal; Navgire, Ruth; Shinde, Priya; Banale, Rituja; Unde, Rohini; Reddy, Ruhi; Shaikh, Shahin; Konnur, Aishwarya; Namewar, Namrata; Bapat, Ashwini; Patil, Ankita; Johari, Rateeka; Kushwaha, Roli; Kumari, Wimpy; Varghese, Beenu; Deshpande, Pooja; Deshmukh, Chetan; Kelkar, Devaki A.; Shashidhara, L S; Koppiker, Chaitanyanand B; Kulkarni, Madhura (2021). "Breast cancer biobank from a single institutional cohort in an urban setting in india: Tumor characteristics and survival outcomes". Cancer Treatment and Research Communications. 28 100409. doi:10.1016/j.ctarc.2021.100409. PMID 34098400. S2CID 235369714.
- Paul, Rachel; Giraud, Guillaume; Domsch, Katrin; Duffraisse, Marilyne; Marmigère, Frédéric; Khan, Soumen; Vanderperre, Solene; Lohmann, Ingrid; Stoks, Robby; Shashidhara, L. S.; Merabet, Samir (17 May 2021). "Hox dosage contributes to flight appendage morphology in Drosophila". Nature Communications. 12 (1): 2892. Bibcode:2021NatCo..12.2892P. doi:10.1038/s41467-021-23293-8. PMC 8129201. PMID 34001903.
- Nagarkar, Sanket; Wasnik, Ruchi; Govada, Pravallika; Cohen, Stephen; Shashidhara, L S (September 2020). "Promoter Proximal Pausing Limits Tumorous Growth Induced by the Yki Transcription Factor in Drosophila". Genetics. 216 (1): 67–77. doi:10.1534/genetics.120.303419. PMC 7463282. PMID 32737120.
- Groth, Casper; Vaid, Pooja; Khatpe, Aditi; Prashali, Nelchi; Ahiya, Avantika; Andrejeva, Diana; Chakladar, Madhumita; Nagarkar, Sanket; Paul, Rachel; Kelkar, Devaki; Eichenlaub, Teresa; Herranz, Hector; Sridhar, Ts; Cohen, Stephen M; Shashidhara, Ls (September 2020). "Genome-Wide Screen for Context-Dependent Tumor Suppressors Identified Using in Vivo Models for Neoplasia in Drosophila". G3: Genes, Genomes, Genetics. 10 (9): 2999–3008. doi:10.1534/g3.120.401545. PMC 7467006. PMID 32737065. S2CID 220909235.
- Kulkarni, Apurv; Kelkar, Devaki A.; Parikh, Nidhi; Shashidhara, Lingadahalli S.; Koppiker, Chaitanyanand B.; Kulkarni, Madhura (November 2020). "Meta-Analysis of Prevalence of Triple-Negative Breast Cancer and Its Clinical Features at Incidence in Indian Patients With Breast Cancer". JCO Global Oncology. 6 (6): 1052–1062. doi:10.1200/go.20.00054. PMC 7392736. PMID 32639876.
- De las Heras, José M.; García-Cortés, Celia; Foronda, David; Pastor-Pareja, José Carlos; Shashidhara, L. S.; Sánchez-Herrero, Ernesto (2018). "The Drosophila Hox gene Ultrabithorax controls appendage shape by regulating extracellular matrix dynamics". Development. 145 (13) dev.161844. doi:10.1242/dev.161844. PMID 29853618. S2CID 46923499.
- Shukla, Jay Prakash; Deshpande, Girish; Shashidhara, L. S. (2017). "Ataxin-2 binding protein 1 is a context-specific positive regulator of Notch signaling during neurogenesis in Drosophila melanogaster". Development. 144 (5): 905–915. doi:10.1242/dev.140657. PMC 5374347. PMID 28174239.
- Singh, Savita; Sánchez-Herrero, Ernesto; Shashidhara, L.S. (November 2015). "Critical role for Fat/Hippo and IIS/Akt pathways downstream of Ultrabithorax during haltere specification in Drosophila". Mechanisms of Development. 138: 198–209. doi:10.1016/j.mod.2015.07.017. hdl:10261/133365. PMID 26299254. S2CID 5013529.
- Naveen Prasad, Shreeharsha Tarikere, Dhanashree Khanale, Farhat Habib, Lingadahalli S Shashidhara (June 2016). "A comparative genomic analysis of targets of Hox protein Ultrabithorax amongst distant insect species". Scientific Reports. 6 27885. Bibcode:2016NatSR...627885P. doi:10.1038/srep27885. PMC 4906271. PMID 27296678.
- Pavan Agrawal, Lingadahalli S Shashidhara (August 2013). "ChIP for Hox Proteins from Drosophila Imaginal Discs". Hox Genes. Methods in Molecular Biology. Vol. 1196. pp. 241–253. doi:10.1007/978-1-4939-1242-1_15. ISBN 978-1-4939-1241-4. PMID 25151168.
- Sindhu Subramaniam, Prethish Sreenivas, Sirisha Cheedipudi, Vatrapu Rami Reddy, Lingadahalli S Shashidhara, Ravi Kumar Chilukoti, Madhavi Mylavarapu, Jyotsna Dhawan (June 2013). "Distinct Transcriptional Networks in Quiescent Myoblasts: A Role for Wnt Signaling in Reversible vs. Irreversible Arrest". PLOS ONE. 8 (6) e65097. Bibcode:2013PLoSO...865097S. doi:10.1371/journal.pone.0065097. PMC 3670900. PMID 23755177.
- F M De Graeve, Véronique Van De Bor, C Ghiglione, Stephane Noselli (May 2012). "Drosophila apc regulates delamination of invasive epithelial clusters". Developmental Biology. 368 (1): 76–85. doi:10.1016/j.ydbio.2012.05.017. PMID 22627290.
- Bright Starling Emerald, Lingadahalli S Shashidhara (April 2012). "Negative regulation ofUltrabithorax expression byengrailed is required for proper specification of wing development inDrosophila melanogaster". Journal of Genetics. 1 (79): 61–70. doi:10.1007/BF02728947. S2CID 20816658.
- Pavan Agrawal, Farhat Habib, Ramesh Yelagandula, L. S. Shashidharaa (December 2011). "Genome-level identification of targets of Hox protein Ultrabithorax in Drosophila: novel mechanisms for target selection". Scientific Reports. 1 (205) 205. Bibcode:2011NatSR...1..205A. doi:10.1038/srep00205. PMC 3244697. PMID 22355720.
- N Usha, LS Shashidhara (March 2011). "The Drosophila Homologue of Ataxin-2 Binding Protein: Toward a Fruit Fly Model of Spinocerebellar Ataxia Type 2?". Alternatives to Laboratory Animals. 39 (1): 70.
- P R Rao, Kalpana Makhijani, Lingadahalli S Shashidhara (May 2008). "Human APC sequesters β-catenin even in the absence of GSK-3β in a Drosophila model". Oncogene. 27 (17): 2488–93. doi:10.1038/sj.onc.1210890. PMID 17968317.

=== General Articles, Books and Policy Documents ===
- Lingadahalli S Shashidhara (August 2004). "Edward B Lewis (1918–2004)". Journal of Genetics. 83 (2): 219. doi:10.1007/BF02729900. S2CID 32404226.
- L. S. Shashidhara (2010) Convener, Vision Group of INSA which drafted a Vision document for Indian Science in 2010
- L. S. Shashidhara (10 July 2011). "What is interdisciplinary science?". IndiaBioscience.
- L. S. Shashidhara (16 July 2011). "Science education and research in 21st century India". IndiaBioscience.
- L. S. Shashidhara (3 August 2011). "Postdoctoral Culture". IndiaBioscience.
- L. S. Shashidhara (31 August 2011). "Democracy in our research organizations". IndiaBioscience.
- L. S. Shashidhara (3 December 2011). "Understanding bureaucracy". IndiaBioscience.
- Lingadahalli S Shashidhara (September 2014). "Who are 'people of genius'?" (PDF). Current Science. 107 (5): 731–732.
- L. S. Shashidhara (16 December 2015). "As IISERs enter their 10th year, a self-congratulatory note on Biology research". IndiaBioscience.
- (2017–18) Commissioned and Edited, an anthology on "Impact of Science in Independent India"
- L. S. Shashidhara (10 January 2017) Co-author: "Scientific advancements in Independent India. Current Science, Vol. 112"

=== Selected Videos and Podcasts ===
- "Science for Society: Science to Fight Covid-19 and Cancer: Perspectives from Pune", by Pune International Center (2021)
- "A journey in science...a journey in life", by BIIS (2021)
- "Science on the Pandemic and Science through the Pandemic", a webinar as a part of the Vigyan Setu Webinar Series by INSA-INYAS (2020)
- "Gender Equality in Science", a podcast by the International Science Council, as a part of the celebration of 'International Day of Women and Girls in Science', at UNESCO (2020)
- "COVID-19 and Animals: doubts clarified", by Talking It Up (2020)
- "Leadership and Mentoring", at the Science Leadership Workshop, (2020)
- "SDGs Learning, Training & Practice" as a part of the High-level Political Forum, by the United Nations (2019)
- "Why and how to integrate research and education?", uploaded by IndiaBioScience (2019)
- "QnA session with Professor L S Shashidhara, IISER Pune", uploaded by LivingScience (2016)
- "Eureka with Prof L S Shashidhara", uploaded by Rajya Sabha Television, an Indian public broadcast service (2016)
- "Impact of Science on Society", uploaded by LivingScience (2016)
- "NCBS Talk 1", uploaded by Bangalore Life Sciences Cluster (2010)

== See also ==
- Drosophila melanogaster
- Homeotic selector gene
- Adenomatous polyposis coli
- Ultrabithorax
