= Intralaminar thalamic nuclei =

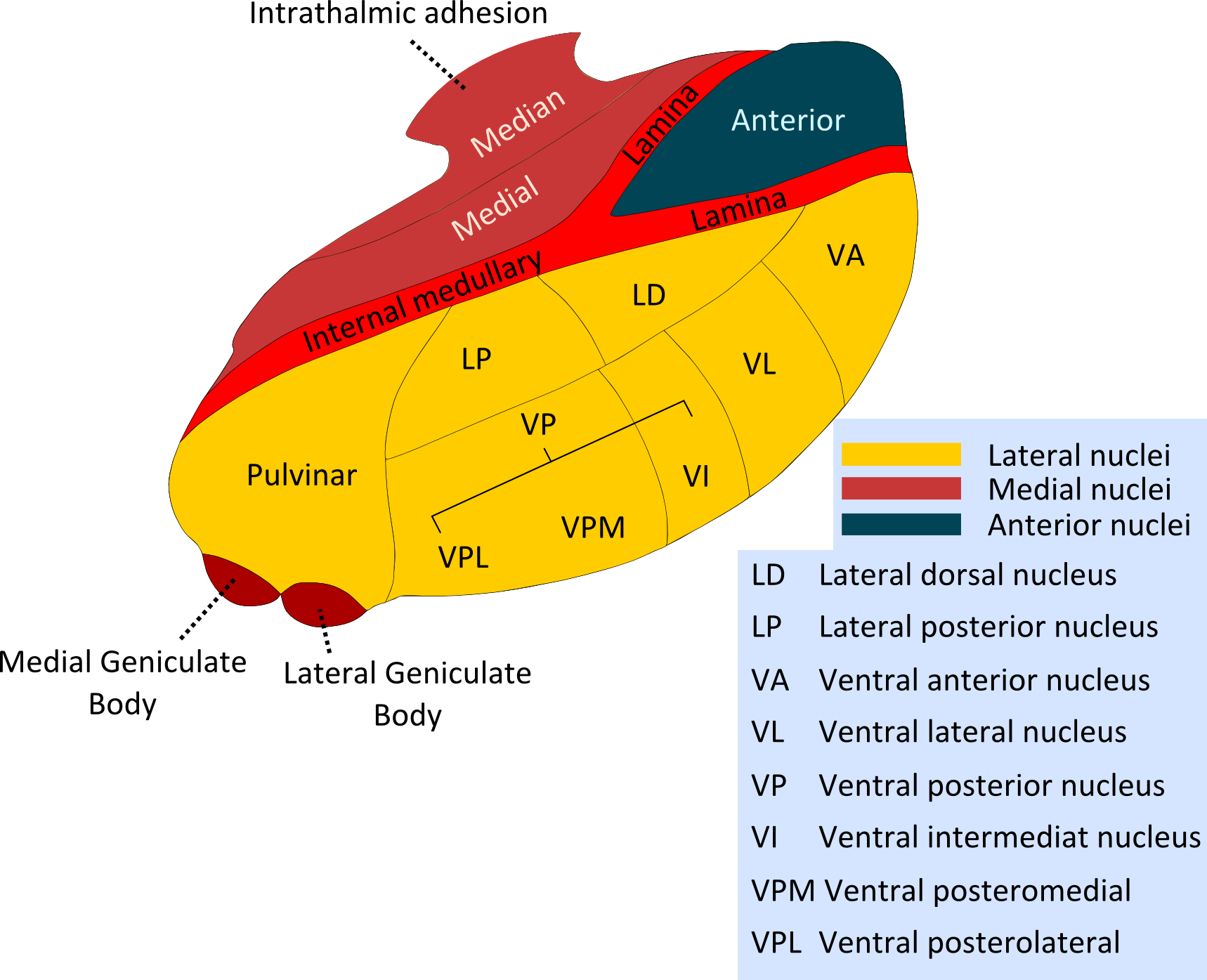
- Thalamic nuclei

Details
- Part of: Thalamus

Identifiers
- Latin: nuclei intralaminares thalami
- Acronym: ITN
- MeSH: D020646
- NeuroNames: 317
- NeuroLex ID: birnlex_1530
- TA98: A14.1.08.615
- TA2: 5685
- FMA: 62021

The intralaminar thalamic nuclei (ITN) are collections of neurons in the internal medullary lamina of the thalamus.

== Anatomy ==
=== Structure ===
The ITN are generally divided in two groups as follows:

- anterior (rostral) group
  - central lateral nucleus
  - central medial nucleus (not referred to as "centromedial")
  - paracentral nucleus
- posterior (caudal) intralaminar group
  - centromedian nucleus
  - parafascicular nucleus

Some sources also include a "central dorsal" nucleus.

=== Afferents ===
Midline intralaminar nuclei receive afferents from the brain stem, spinal cord, and cerebellum. Connections with the cerebral cortex and basal nuclei are reciprocal. Afferents from the spinothalamic tract as well as periaqueductal gray are part of a pathway involved in pain processing.

=== Efferents ===
The intralaminar nuclei project efferents to the hypothalamus, amygdala, and limbic lobe.

== Function ==
The ITN are thought to be involved in mediating arousal, affective, autonomic responses to pain.

== Clinical significance ==
Degeneration of this area may occur in progressive supranuclear palsy and Parkinson's disease.

== Research ==
This area is also prominently affected in traumatic brain injuries. One postmortem study of patients with closed head injuries showed correlation of the involvement of these nuclei with the various degrees of disability.

== See also ==
- Central tegmental tract
- Output of the ARAS
