= Artery of Percheron =

- Diagram of the arterial circulation at the base of the brain (inferior view). The artery of Percheron (not shown) arise from either the left or right posterior cerebral artery (bottom forks)

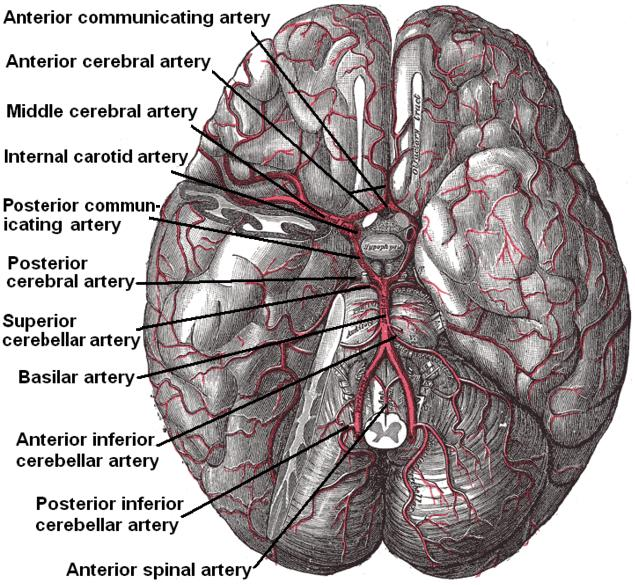

Details
- Source: Posterior cerebral artery
- Supplies: Both sides of thalamus and midbrain

The artery of Percheron (AOP) is a rare anatomical variation in the brain vascularization in which a single arterial trunk arises from the posterior cerebral artery (PCA) to supply both sides of the thalamus and midbrain.

== Clinical significance ==
The functions of the thalamus and midbrain include the regulation of consciousness, sleep and alertness. Occlusion of the artery of Percheron, for example by a clot, could result in a posterior circulation infarct impairing structures on both sides of the brain. This can produce a bizarre disturbance such as sleep from which the patient cannot be awakened.

== History ==
The artery of Percheron was first described in 1973 by the French medical scientist Gerard Percheron.

== In popular culture ==
In Season 3 episode 13 of Chicago Med titled Best Laid Plans, a patient was found to have this anomaly after she was found in an unawakenable state caused by a clot in this area. As the patient was post the window for TPA, the patient was cured after local thrombolysis without any sequalae.
