= Germain Celestin Edouard Fournie =

Germain Célestin Édouard Fournié (4 March 1833 – 24 March 1886) was a French surgeon, medical doctor, anatomist and physiologist, and a prominent specialist in the field of the voice and speech physiology, as well as fields of neuroanatomy and neurophysiology. He was born in Limoux (Aude, France) on 4 March 1833 in the house of his maternal grandfather, Louis Joly. His father, Jean François Fournié, who was a doctor of medicine, served at the time as an Inspector of the mineral waters of Alet-les-Bains. His mother, Marie Célestine Joly, was from a rich and notable family.

== Biography ==
Starting at 14 years old, Edouard was studying medicine under close supervision of his father. At the age of 20, on 23 January 1853, Edouard joined the Imperial Navy as an auxiliary surgeon (surgeon helper). First he was appointed to the Marengo, but then, in 1854, he was sent to the Crimea. His responsibility was to perform medical care on French soldiers and sailors suffering from cholera. In the process of this care, he himself was severely affected by this terrible disease, and had almost died.

At the time of the siege of Sebastopol he served as a major surgeon on a big French flagship Le Caton. Then, in 1855, he was assigned to the hospital Therapia in Constantinople, with the responsibility to perform medical care on typhus patients. Again, he got severely infected and again had almost died. After that, he was repatriated to the France and retired from the army. He then completed his medical studies at the University of Montpellier, and on 4 March 1857, being exactly 24 years of age, had successfully finished his doctoral thesis, named French: Du typhus observé à l’hôpital maritime de Thérapia (Typhus observed at the maritime hospital at Therapia).

== Scientific contributions ==
The articles and books Edouard Fournie had produced during his long scientific career included wide areas of medical knowledge. Among his major papers are those concerned with the anatomy and physiology of human and mammalian central nervous system, localizations of different functions in the brain, several aspects of medical philosophy and ethics, human psychology et cetera. His pioneering works on the physiology of human voice and speech started to resonate in international scientific and medical spheres only after his death.

In 1873, Edouard Fournie tried to experiment to gain better understanding of the role of the thalamus in the brain. Having that idea in mind, he injected zinc chloride into the thalami of cats. Soon after that, he could observe in those cats severely diminished tactile, heat and pain sensitivity on the side, contralateral to the side of injection. Fournie's observations greatly helped to establish the role of thalamus as a major sensory relay station on the way to cortex.

== Major publications ==
- French: Des rapports des médecins et des pharmaciens avec les sociétés de secours mutuels (1861).
- De la pénétration des corps pulvérulents, gazeux, solides et liquides dans les voies respiratoires au point de vue de l'hygiène et de la thérapeutique (1862).
- Étude pratique sur le laryngoscope et sur l'application des remèdes topiques dans les voies respiratoires (1863).
- Mémoire lu à l’Académie des Sciences, dans la séance du 11 avril, Physiologie de la voix (1864).
- Physiologie de la voix et de la parole (1866).
- Consultation médicale sur le choléra (1866).
- Physiologie et instruction du sourd-muet d'après la physiologie des divers langages (1868).
- Physiologie du système nerveux cérébro-spinal (1872).
- Recherches expérimentales sur le fonctionnement du cerveau (1873).
- Note lue à l’Académie de Médecine, le 4 août 1874, Physiologie et Instruction des sourds-muets (1874).
- Essai de psychologie: la bête et l'homme (1877).
- Physiologie des sons de la voix et de la parole (1877).
- Application des sciences à la médecine (1878).
- Du rôle de la trompe d'Eustache dans la physiologie de l'audition (1880).
- Contribution à l'étude de l'emploi des métaux, de l'électricité et du magnétisme en médecine (1881).
- La trompe d'Eustache. Physiologie de la voix et la parole. Localisations cérébrales. Physiologie pathologique des hallucinations (1881).
- Ch. Darwin, étude critique (1882).
- Claude Bernard et la méthode expérimentale (1882).
- In co-authorship with his father, Jean François Fournié, in 1859: De l'emploi thérapeutique de l'eau d'Alet.
