= Posterior circulation infarct =

- Diagram of the arterial circulation at the base of the brain (inferior view). Posterior circulation represented by bottom half of diagram.
- Specialty: Neurology

Posterior circulation infarct (POCI) is a type of cerebral infarction affecting the posterior circulation supplying one side of the brain.

Posterior circulation stroke syndrome (POCS) refers to the symptoms of a patient who clinically appears to have had a posterior circulation infarct, but who has not yet had any diagnostic imaging (e.g. CT Scan) to confirm the diagnosis.

It can cause the following symptoms:

- Cranial nerve palsy AND contralateral motor/sensory defect
- Bilateral motor or sensory defect
- Eye movement problems (e.g.nystagmus)
- Cerebellar dysfunction
- Isolated homonymous hemianopia
- Vertigo

It has also been associated with deafness.

== See also ==
- Stroke
- Artery of Percheron
