= Ontophylogenesis =

Ontophylogenesis merges the concepts of Ontogenesis and Phylogenesis to yield Darwinian theory at the cellular level.

Described by its originator Jean-Jacques Kupiec as "the extension of natural selection, taking place inside the organism among the cell populations of which it is constituted. It ends with evolution and ontogenesis merging into a single phenomenon."

Hierarchical analysis of ontogenetic time describing heterochrony and taxonomy of developmental stages is viewed as a segmentation of ontogenetic time depicting phylogenesis. This permits the graphical depiction of time based evolutions of organs for a set of species, and is consistent with accepted theories of evolutionary biology.
