= Allothalamus =

The Allothalamus is a division used by some researchers in describing the thalamus.

== Paramedian formation ==
This or periventricular formation lies along the wall of the third ventricle. In man where there is no or almost no adhaesio interthalamica this is reduced to a thin layer medial to the medial nucleus. This lamina has no clear subdivisions and the formation may be seen as one entity. Contrarily to the isothalamus it stains for numerous mediators. Its connections are not really known, participating in periventricular systems.

=== Intralaminar-limitans formation Il-Li ===
This does not include the central region (centre-median, see below). Along with the paramedian formation, it makes a kind of capsule around the medial nucleus ("circular nucleus"). Together they are deeply regressive structures in evolution. Only its anterior part is clearly present in humans. Caudally, dorsal to the central region it breaks into small islands. Some of them are just posterior to the central complex. In the part dorsal to the complex, the aspect is deeply different from what is seen in macaques where "intralaminar" elements receive particular afferents such as cerebellar and tectal. The tectal afferents observed in macaques for instance have probably moved to the lateral region in humans, in VImM and VA. In any case the connections demonstrated in macaques cannot be assessed simply. The regression of intralaminar elements is to be contrasted with the huge increase of the cerebral cortex in man to ponderate the role of the intralaminar formation into the unspecific activation of the cortex. The nucleus limitans appears with primates. Its lower border clearly indicate that of the pulvinar. Along with intralaminar islands, it receives spinothalamic afferences. Having the same properties, it is linked to them in the intralaminar-limitans formation. The posterior part receives axons from the spinothalamic fascicle and from the tectum. It sends its axons to the striatum constituting in man only a weak part of the thalamo-striatal connection.

=== Central region C ===
This corresponds to the "centre médian -parafascicular complex". Considering its ontogenesis, position, structure and connections, it does not belong, as usually said, to the intralaminar group. It is almost everywhere surrounded by a capsule. Dorsally this is made by a ventral extension of the lamina medialis but laterally, this is made by the lamina centralis separating it from the lateral region. In upper primates, the region or complex is not constituted by two but by three nuclei with their own neuronal species (Fenelon et al.1994). From there, two opposed interpretations were proposed concerning the belonging of the intermediate part: either to the centre médian (Vogt & Vogt, 1941) or to the parafascicular nucleus (Niimi et al., 1960). This is undecidable. It has thus been proposed to group the three elements together in the regio Centralis (since it is a classical nucleus). From medially to laterally, one describes the pars parafascicularis, the pars media and the pars paralateralis. The first two strongly stain for acetylcholinesterase. They have strong connections with elements of the basal ganglia system. The pars parafascicularis is linked bilaterally to the substantia nigra. It receives in addition axons from the superior colliculus. Its sends axons to the associative striatum. The pars media receives a major connection from the medial pallidum. It also receives axons from the motor and premotor cortex. Its major efference is to the striatum (sensorimotor territory) (Fenelon et al. 1991). It is one element of the Nauta-Mehler's circuit (striatum-pallidum-pars media-striatum). The two medial elements are the main contributors to the thalamo-striatal connection. Their mediator is glutamate. The third, most lateral part (paralateral) receives from and sends axons to the central cortex, motor and premotor. The central region thus appears not as a nonspecific part of the thalamus but as one element of the basal ganglia system: one of its regulators. see Primate basal ganglia system.
