= Nonmotor region of the ventral nuclear group =

Nonmotor region of the ventral nuclear group is a substructure of the ventral nuclear group of the thalamus based on connectivity and function. It corresponds to the caudal part of the ventral posterolateral nucleus, which receives input from the medial lemniscus. The anterodorsal portion of this region receives primarily proprioceptive afferents. The central portion receives primarily cutaneous afferents.
