= Thalamic reticular nucleus =

Part of the thalamus

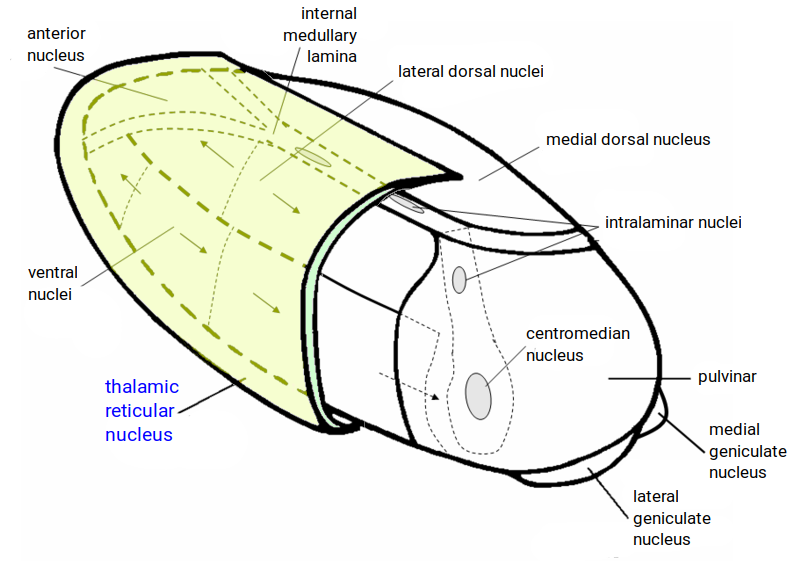
- Left thalamus reticular nucleus

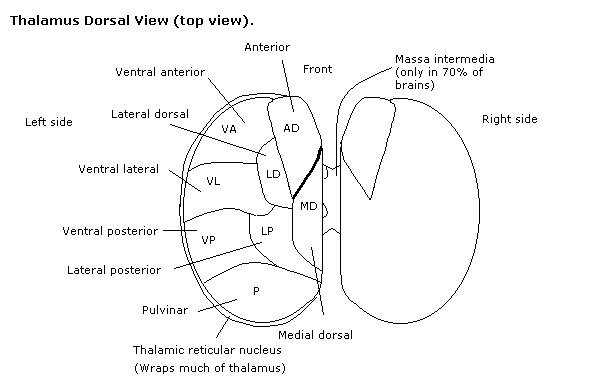
- Thalamus dorsal view

Details
- Part of: Thalamus

Identifiers
- Latin: nucleus reticularis thalami
- NeuroNames: 365
- NeuroLex ID: birnlex_1721
- TA98: A14.1.08.638
- TA2: 5704
- FMA: 62026

The thalamic reticular nucleus is part of the ventral thalamus that forms a capsule around the thalamus laterally. However, recent evidence from mice and fish question this statement and define it as a dorsal thalamic structure. It is separated from the thalamus by the external medullary lamina. Reticular nucleus cells are all GABAergic, and have discoid dendritic arbors in the plane of the nucleus.

Thalamic Reticular Nucleus is variously abbreviated TRN, RTN, NRT, and RT. The TRN is found in all mammals.

== Input and output ==
The thalamic reticular nucleus receives input from the cerebral cortex and dorsal thalamic nuclei. Most input comes from collaterals of fibers passing through the thalamic reticular nucleus.

The outputs from the primary thalamic reticular nucleus project to dorsal thalamic nuclei, but never to the cerebral cortex. This is the only thalamic nucleus that does not project to the cerebral cortex. Instead it modulates the information from other nuclei in the thalamus. Its function is modulatory on signals going through the thalamus (and the reticular nucleus).

The thalamic reticular nucleus receives massive projections from the external segment of the globus pallidus, thought to play a part in disinhibition of thalamic cells, which is essential for initiation of movement (Parent and Hazrati, 1995).

It has been suggested that the reticular nucleus receives afferent input from the reticular formation and in turn projects to the other thalamic nuclei, regulating the flow of information through these to the cortex. There is debate over the presence of distinct sectors within the nucleus that each correspond to a different sensory or cognitive modality.

For original connectivity anatomy see Jones 1975.

For discussion of mapping and cross modality pathways see Crabtree 2002.
