= Subthalamic fasciculus =

Bi-directional nerve tract

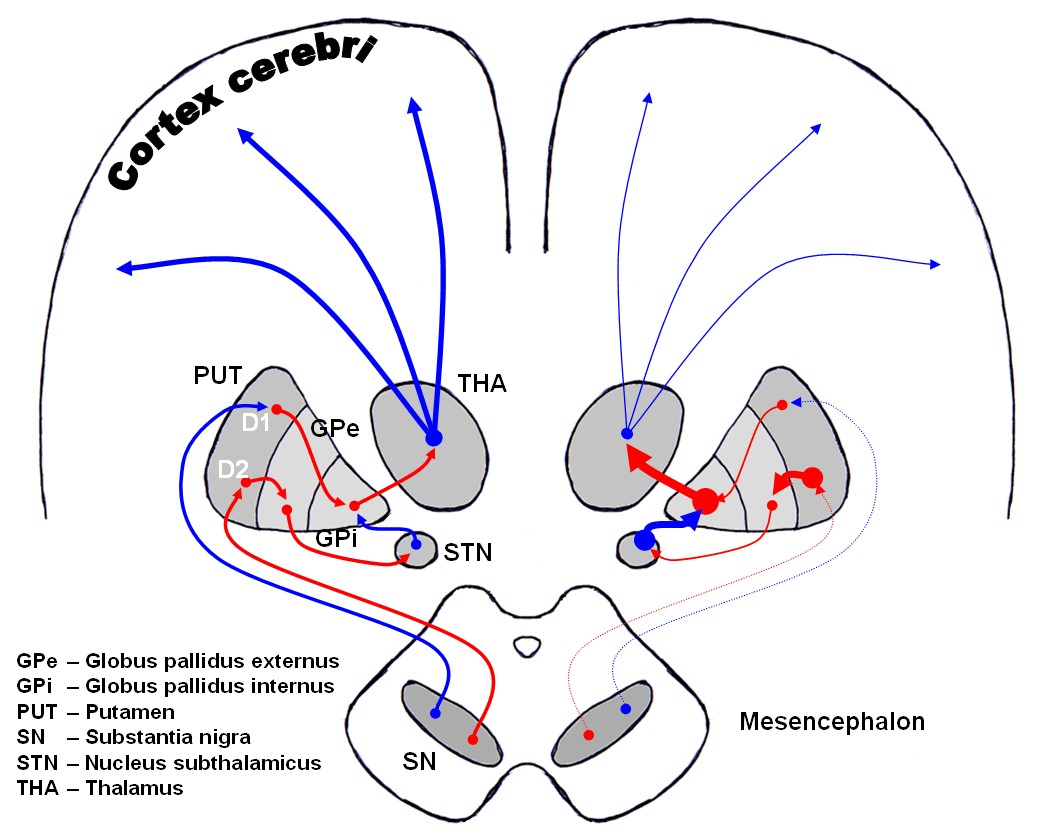
- DA-loops in Parkinson's disease (Subthalamic fasciculus visible but not labeled.)

Details

Identifiers
- Latin: fasciculus subthalamicus
- NeuroNames: 2280
- TA98: A14.1.08.677; A14.1.09.522
- TA2: 5755
- FMA: 77525

The subthalamic fasciculus is a bi-directional nerve tract that interconnects the lateral globus pallidus and subthalamic nucleus as part of the indirect pathway. The pallidal efferents are GABAergic, but also contain enkephalin. Its fibers interweave perpendicularly among the fibers of the internal capsule.
