= Centromedian nucleus =

Anatomical part

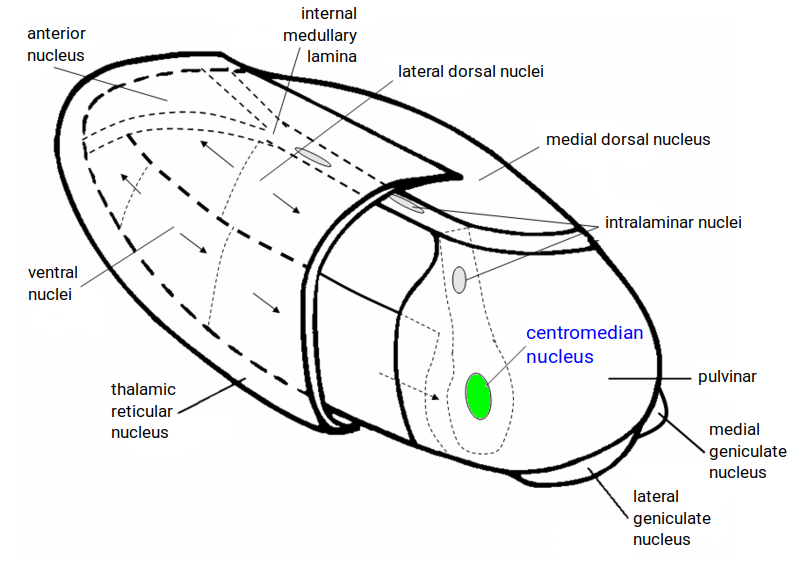
- Centromedian nucleus inside left thalamus

Details
- Part of: Intralaminar thalamic nuclei

Identifiers
- Latin: nucleus centromedianus thalami
- Acronym: CM or Cm-Pf
- NeuroNames: 323
- NeuroLex ID: birnlex_805
- TA98: A14.1.08.618
- FMA: 62165

In the anatomy of the brain, the centromedian nucleus, also known as the centrum medianum, (CM or Cm-Pf) is a nucleus in the posterior group of the intralaminar thalamic nuclei (ITN) in the thalamus. (This must not be confused with the central medial nucleus, which is in the anterior group of the ITN.) There are two centromedian nuclei arranged bilaterally.

In humans, each centromedian nucleus contains about 2200 neurons per cubic millimetre and has a volume of about 310 cubic millimetres with 664,000 neurons in total. It measures less than 10 millimetres in every dimension. It belongs to the caudal intralaminar group of thalamic nuclei and is situated within the medial thalamus. It is bordered superiorly by the mediodorsal nucleus, medially by the parafascicular nucleus, and posteriorly by the pulvinar.

== Input and output ==
It sends nerve fibres to the subthalamic nucleus and putamen. It receives nerve fibres from the cerebral cortex, vestibular nuclei, globus pallidus, superior colliculus, reticular formation, and spinothalamic tract.

== Function ==
Its physiological role involves attention and arousal, including control of the level of cortical activity. Some frequencies of extracellular electrical stimulation of the centromedian nucleus can cause absence seizures (temporary loss of consciousness) although electrical stimulation can be of therapeutic use in intractable epilepsy and Tourette's syndrome. Specifically, the centromedian nucleus has been proposed as a target for neuromodulation-based treatment of generalized epilepsy.

General anaesthetics specifically suppress activity in the ITN, including the centromedian nucleus. Complete bilateral lesions of the centromedian nucleus can lead to states normally associated with brain death such as coma, death, persistent vegetative state, forms of mutism and severe delirium. Unilateral lesions can lead to unilateral thalamic neglect. (See hemispatial neglect.)

A patient with electrodes implanted into more than 50 different regions in his brain (including regions giving him orgasmic feelings) chose to self stimulate the electrode in his centromedian nucleus more than all other electrodes. The patient's explanation of this: "The subject reported that he was almost able to recall a memory during this stimulation, but he could not quite grasp it. The frequent selfstimulations were an endeavor to bring this elusive memory into clear focus."

== Additional images ==
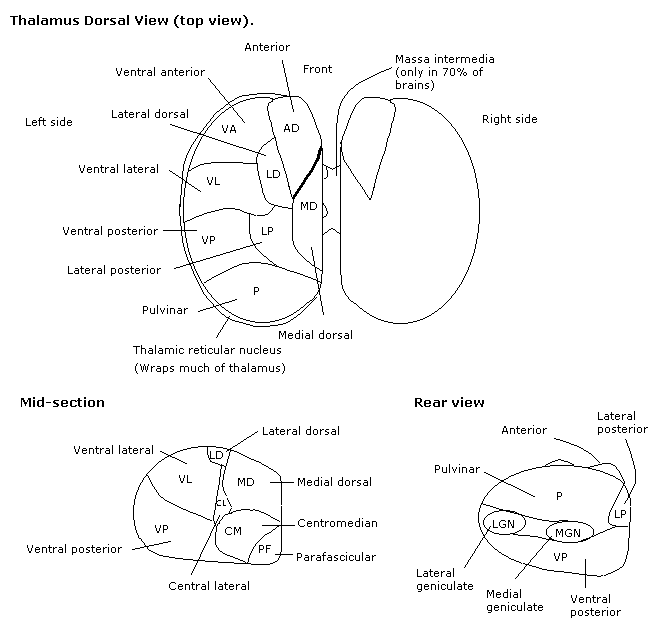
Thalamus

Left thalamus, view from left dorsal posterior
