= Phylogenesis =

Biological process by which a taxon appears

Phylogenetic divergence (phyletic gradualism) (above) shows relatively slow changes during geologic epoch: the broken balance (below) illustrates morphological stability and (rarely) the relatively rapid evolutionary change.

Phylogenesis (from Greek φῦλον phylon "tribe" + γένεσις genesis "origin") is the biological process by which a taxon (of any rank) appears. The science that studies these processes is called phylogenetics.

These terms may be confused with the term phylogenetics, the application of molecular - analytical methods (i.e. molecular biology and genomics), in the explanation of phylogeny and its research.

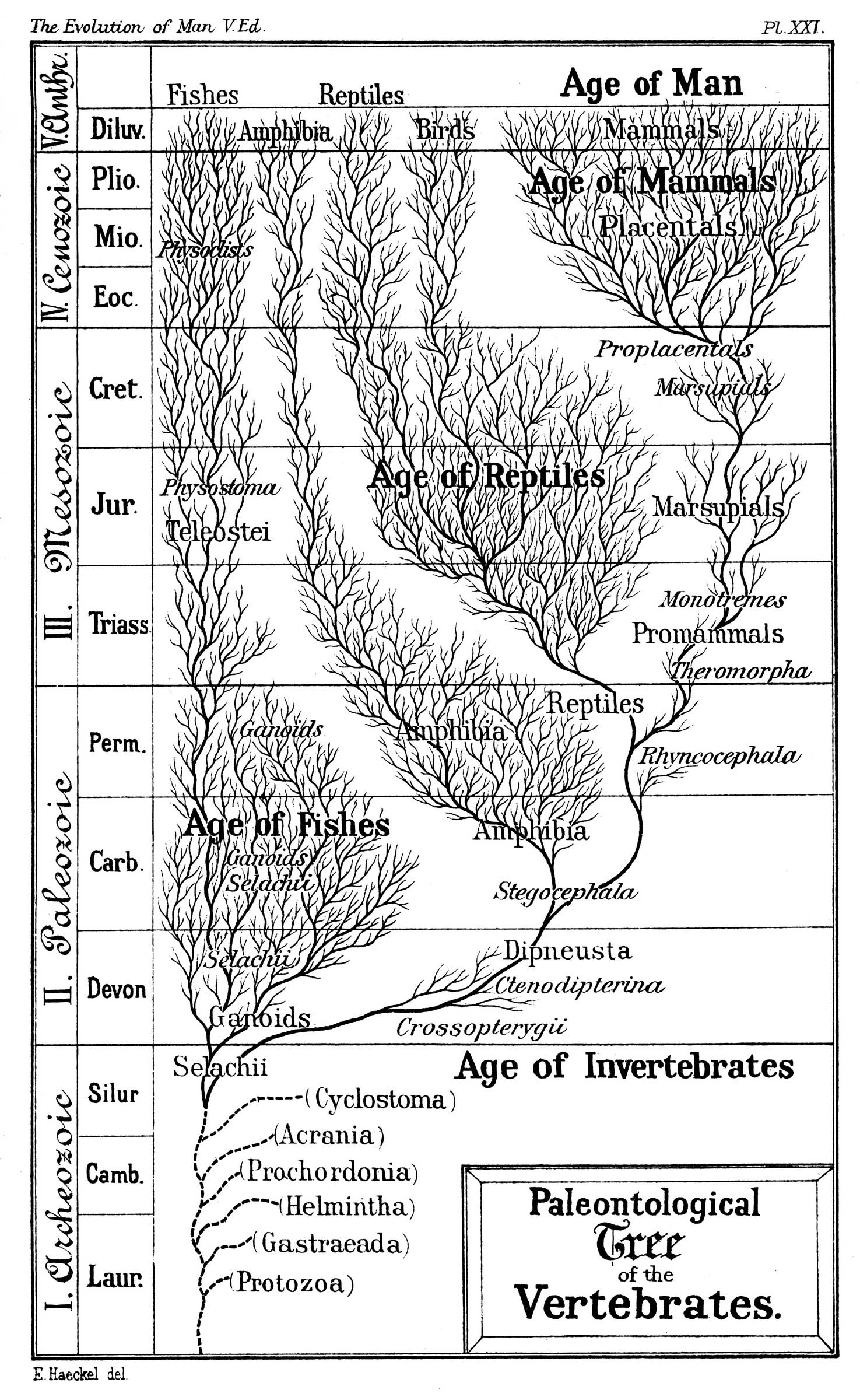
Haeckel's paleontological tree of vertebrates (about 1879). Evolutionary history of given species is described in phylogenetic tree.

Phylogenetic relationships are discovered through phylogenetic inference methods that evaluate observed heritable traits, such as DNA sequences or overall morpho-anatomical, ethological, and other characteristics.

== Phylogeny ==
The result of these analyses is a phylogeny (also known as a phylogenetic tree) – a diagrammatic hypothesis about the history of the evolutionary relationships of a group of organisms. Phylogenetic analyses have become central to understanding biodiversity, evolution, ecological genetics and genomes.

== Cladistics ==
Cladistics (Greek κλάδος, klados, i.e. "branch") is an approach to biological classification in which organisms are categorized based on shared, derived characteristics that can be traced to a group's most recent common ancestor and are not present in more distant ancestors. Therefore, members of a group are assumed to share a common history and are considered to be closely related.

The cladistic method interprets each character state transformation implied by the distribution of shared character states among taxa (or other terminals) as a potential piece of evidence for grouping. The outcome of a cladistic analysis is a cladogram – a tree-shaped diagram (dendrogram) that is interpreted to represent the best hypothesis of phylogenetic relationships.

Although traditionally such cladograms were generated largely on the basis of morphological characteristics calculated by hand, genetic sequencing data and computational phylogenetics are now commonly used and the parsimony criterion has been abandoned by many phylogeneticists in favor of more "sophisticated" (but less parsimonious) evolutionary models of character state transformation.

== Taxonomy ==
Taxonomy (Greek language τάξις, taxis = 'order', 'arrangement' + νόμος, nomos = 'law' or 'science') is the classification, identification and naming of organisms. It is usually richly informed by phylogenetics, but remains a methodologically and logically distinct discipline. The degree to which taxonomies depend on phylogenies (or classification depends on evolutionary development) differs depending on the school of taxonomy: phenetics ignores phylogeny altogether, trying to represent the similarity between organisms instead; cladistics (phylogenetic systematics) tries to reproduce phylogeny in its classification.

== Ontophylogenesis ==
An extension of phylogenesis to the cellular level by Jean-Jacques Kupiec is known as Ontophylogenesis

== Similarities and differences ==
- Phylogenesis ≠ Phylogeny;
- Phylogenesis ≠ (≈) Phylogenetics;
- Phylogenesis ≠ Cladistics;
- Phylogenetics ≠ Cladistics;
- Taxonomy ≠ Cladistics.

== See also ==
- Phylogeny
- Phylogenetics
- Taxonomy
- Cladistics
- Ontogeny
- Evolution
