= Homeotic selector gene =

Homeotic selector genes confer segment identity in Drosophila. They encode homeodomain proteins which interact with Hox and other homeotic genes to initiate segment-specific gene regulation. Homeodomain proteins are transcription factors that share a DNA-binding domain called the homeodomain. Changes in the expression and function of homeotic genes are responsible for the changes in the morphology of the limbs of arthropods as well as in the axial skeletons of vertebrates. Mutations in homeotic selector genes do not lead to elimination of a segment or pattern, but instead cause the segment to develop incorrectly.

== History ==
The homeotic selector genes were discovered through the genetic analysis of Drosophila over 80 years ago. Unusual disturbances were found in the organization of the adult fly, resulting in misplaced limbs, such as legs developing where antennae usually develop or an extra pair of wings developing where halteres should be. This discovery provided a glimpse to understanding how each segment acquires its individual identity.

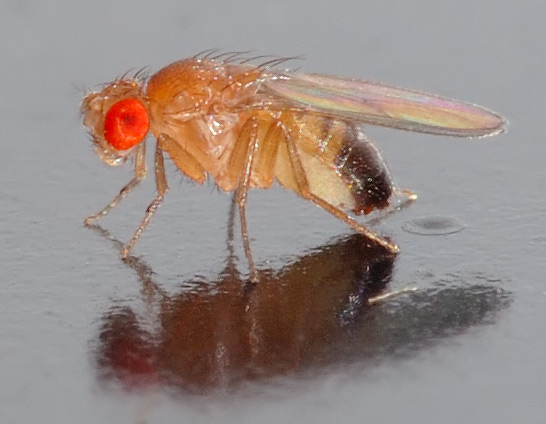
Drosophila melanogaster

The first homeotic gene cluster, the bithorax complex, was discovered by Edward B. Lewis in 1978. Similar mutations in the complex were found to cluster together, leading Lewis to propose that these homeotic genes arose through a duplication mechanism which would conserve the clusters through evolution. The independent discoveries of the homeobox in the 1983 by Walter Gehring's laboratory at the University of Basel, Switzerland, and Thomas Kaufman's laboratory at Indiana University confirmed Lewis's theory.

== Collinearity ==
Collinearity is found between the order of the genes on the chromosome and the order in which the genes are expressed along the anteroposterior axis of the embryo. For example, the lab gene is found in the 3' position in the Antennapedia complex, and is expressed in the most anterior head region of the embryo. At the same time, the Abd-B gene is located at the 5' position of the Bithorax complex, and expressed in the most posterior region of the embryo. This suggests that the genes may be activated through a graded process, in which the action is gradually spread along the chromosome. Although the significance of colinearity is still not understood, it is thought to have an important role, due to its conservation in arthropods, and vertebrates including humans.

== Para-Segment Individuality ==
Homeotic selector genes encode regulatory DNA-binding proteins which are all related through a highly conserved DNA binding sequences called the homeobox (from which the "Hox Complex" name is derived from). Although each all of the DNA-binding complexes are conserved, each para-segment still has an individual identity. The proteins do not bind directly to the DNA, rather, they interact with other regulatory proteins which are already bound to DNA-binding complexes. Different interactions determine which DNA binding sites are recognized and subsequently activated or repressed. Homeotic selector proteins combine in different combinations with regulatory proteins to give each parasegment its identity.

== The Hox Complex Carries Positional Information ==
Certain signals set up the spatial pattern of expression of the Hox complex early in development. The Hox complex acts like a stamp, giving cells in each segment a long term positional value. The cell memory of a given positional value depends on two inputs, the first being the ability of many Hox proteins to autoactivate their own transcription, and the second derived from two large groups of transcriptional regulators: The Polycomb group and the Trithorax group. A defect in either of these regulators results in a pattern which is initially correct but is not maintained at later embryonic stages. The Polycomb and Trithorax regulators act in opposite ways. The Trithorax group maintains Hox transcription after transcription is already activated. The Polycomb group forms stable complexes that bind to the chromatin of Hox genes, and keep it in a repressed state at sites where Hox genes are not active.

== Evolutionary Conservation ==
Homologs of the Homeotic selector gene are found in a variety of species, varying from cnidarians to nematodes, to mammals. These genes are grouped similarly to the Hox complex found in insects. The mouse has four complexes, HoxA, HoxB, HoxC, and HoxD, each on different chromosomes. Individual genes in each complex correspond to specific members of the Drosophila genome. The mammalian Hox genes can function in Drosophila as partial replacements for the Drosophila Hox genes. Each of the four mammalian Hox complexes has a rough counterpart in the insect complex.

The theory behind this evolutionary conservation stems from the belief that some common ancestor of worms, flies, and vertebrates had a single primordial homeotic selector gene, an ancestral Hox complex, that went through repeated duplication to form a series of tandem genes. In Drosophila, this ancestral Hox complex split into two separate complexes: Antennapedia and Bithorax. In mammals, the whole complex repeatedly duplicated resulting in four Hox complexes. This theory has some faults, including that some individual genes have been duplicated while others have been lost.

== Arthropod Diversity ==
Changes in homeotic gene expression contributes to the diversity. The Drosophila genome holds its eight homeotic genes in two complexes. The Invertebrate genome contains 8-10 of is homeotic genes in only one complex, while Vertebrates have duplicated the Hox complex and have four clusters. Changes in the expression and functionality of individual genes result in various morphology as seen in arthropods. The diversity found between the five groups of arthropods is a result of their modular architecture. The arthropods are composed of a series of repeating body segments that can be modified in a limitless number of ways. While some segments may carry antenna, others can be modified to carry wings. Crustaceans have different morphology within the group due to different patterns of Ubx expression in isopods and brachiopods. Similar to brachiopods, isopods have swimming limbs on the second through eighth thoracic segments, however the limbs on the first thoracic segment are smaller than the others, and are used as feeding limbs. The different pattern of Ubx expression correlates with these modifications, possibly a result of an acquired mutation that allows the Ubx enhancers to no longer mediate expression in the first thoracic segment.

== Src Expression ==
Brachiopods: Src expression is limited to the head region in brachipods and helps in the development of feeding appendages. Ubx is expressed in the thorax where it controls the development of swimming limbs.

Isopods: Src expression is detected in both the head and the first thoracic segment (T1) in isopods and as a result, the swimming limb in T1 is transformed into a feeding appendage (the maxillipped). The posterior expansion of Src is possible by the loss of Ubx expression in T1 because Ubx normally represses Src expression.

== Dll Expression ==
Every insect has six legs, one pair found on each of the three thoracic segments while other arthropods have a variable number of limbs. This change in morphology is due to functional changes in the Ubx regulatory protein. Ubx and abd-A repress the expression of Distal-less, Dll, a gene responsible for the development of limbs. In the Drosophila embryo, Ubx is expressed at high levels in the metathorax and anterior abdominal segments; abd-A is expressed in the posterior abdominal segments. In combination, these two genes do not allow Dll to function in the first seven abdominal segments. However, Ubx is expressed in the metathorax and does not interfere with the Dll expression because Dll is activated before Ubx is expressed.

In crustaceans, there are high levels of both Ubx and DII in all 11 thoracic segments. The expression of DII promotes the development of swimming limbs. The Ubx protein does not repress DII in crustaceans because Ubx is functionally different in insects and crustaceans.
