= Myosin-heavy-chain kinase =

Class of enzymes

myosin heavy chain kinase

Identifiers
- EC no.: 2.7.11.7
- CAS no.: 64763-54-8

Databases
- IntEnz: IntEnz view
- BRENDA: BRENDA entry
- ExPASy: NiceZyme view
- KEGG: KEGG entry
- MetaCyc: metabolic pathway
- PRIAM: profile
- PDB structures: RCSB PDB PDBe PDBsum
- Gene Ontology: AmiGO / QuickGO
Search
- PMC: articles
- PubMed: articles
- NCBI: proteins

In enzymology, a myosin-heavy-chain kinase (EC 2.7.11.7) is an enzyme that catalyzes the chemical reaction

ATP + [myosin heavy-chain] $\rightleftharpoons$ ADP + [myosin heavy-chain] phosphate

Thus, the two substrates of this enzyme are ATP and myosin heavy-chain, whereas its two products are ADP and myosin heavy-chain phosphate.

This enzyme belongs to the family of transferases, specifically those transferring a phosphate group to the sidechain oxygen atom of serine or threonine residues in proteins (protein-serine/threonine kinases). The systematic name of this enzyme class is ATP:[myosin heavy-chain] O-phosphotransferase. Other names in common use include

- ATP:myosin-heavy-chain O-phosphotransferase
- calmodulin-dependent myosin heavy chain kinase
- MHCK
- MIHC kinase
- myosin heavy chain kinase
- myosin I heavy-chain kinase
- myosin II heavy-chain kinase
- [myosin-heavy-chain] kinase
- myosin heavy chain kinase A
- STK6.
