= Dihoplus =

Dihoplus Temporal range: Late Miocene–Pliocene
- Dihoplus schleiermacheri holotype skull

Scientific classification
- Kingdom: Animalia
- Phylum: Chordata
- Class: Mammalia
- Order: Perissodactyla
- Family: Rhinocerotidae
- Tribe: Dicerorhinini
- Genus: †Dihoplus; Brandt, 1878

Type species
- †Rhinoceros schleiermacheri Kaup, 1832

Species
- D. bethlehemsis; D. pikermiensis; D. schleiermacheri

Extinct genus of rhinoceros

Dihoplus is an extinct genus of rhinoceros that lived in Eurasia from the Late Miocene to Pliocene.

== Description ==
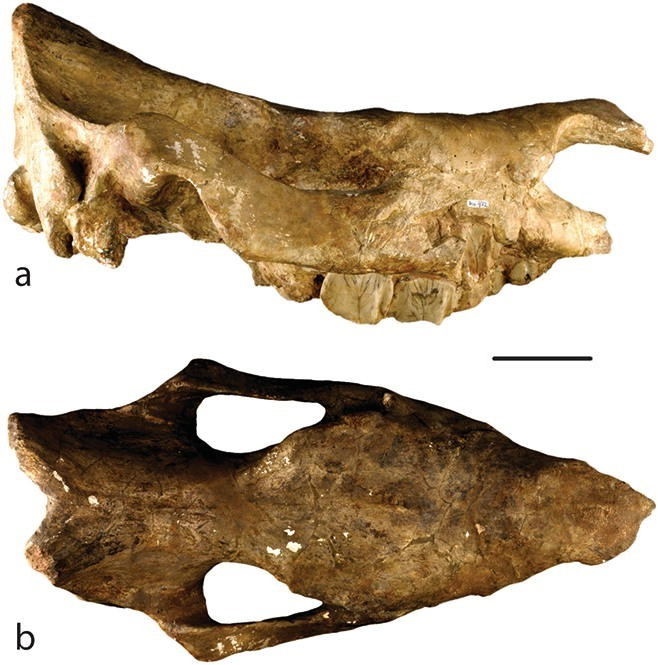
Skull of a subadult Dihoplus pikermiensis from Greece

Species of Dihoplus were large rhinoceroses, with the body masses of Dihoplus schleiermacheri and Dihoplus pikermiensis estimated at 2,122 kilograms (4,678 lb) and 1,100 kilograms (2,400 lb) respectively. The head bore two horns. The nasal septum was not ossified, with a nasal notch above the frontmost premolars. The toothrow is placed posteriorly within the skull. The first upper premolar is absent, though the lower second incisor is present.

== Taxonomy ==
Members of Dihoplus were long placed in Dicerorhinus (which contains the living Sumatran rhinoceros). Sometimes these species are placed in the related Stephanorhinus. The genus is now generally considered distinct, though there is still debate as to which species should be included; for example, Deng (2011) listed Merck's rhinoceros (Stephanorhinus kirchbergensis) under Dihoplus. Species recently placed in the genus include:

- D. schleiermacheri (Kaup, 1832) the type species of the genus, known from Late Miocene of Europe, with the type specimen being known from Eppelsheim, Germany.
- D. pikermiensis (Toula, 1906), known from the Late Miocene of Europe, originally placed in the genus Stephanorhinus.
- ‘D.’ bethlehemsis Pandolfi, Rivals and Rabinovich, 2023, known from Pliocene aged deposits from Bethlehem in the Levant.

"D." megarhinus (de Christol, 1834) from the Late Miocene-Pliocene of Europe, Anatolia, China and Transbaikalia, since 2021 has been placed instead in the genus Pliorhinus along with "Dicerorhinus" miguelcrusafonti from the Pliocene of Europe. "D." ringstoemi is either considered a synonym of "D." megarhinus or placed as a separate species within Pliorhinus.

The monophyly of the genus has been questioned, with some studies suggesting that D. pikermiensis is more closely related to Stephanorhinus and Coelodonta (which contains the woolly rhinoceros) than to the type species D. schleiermacheri.

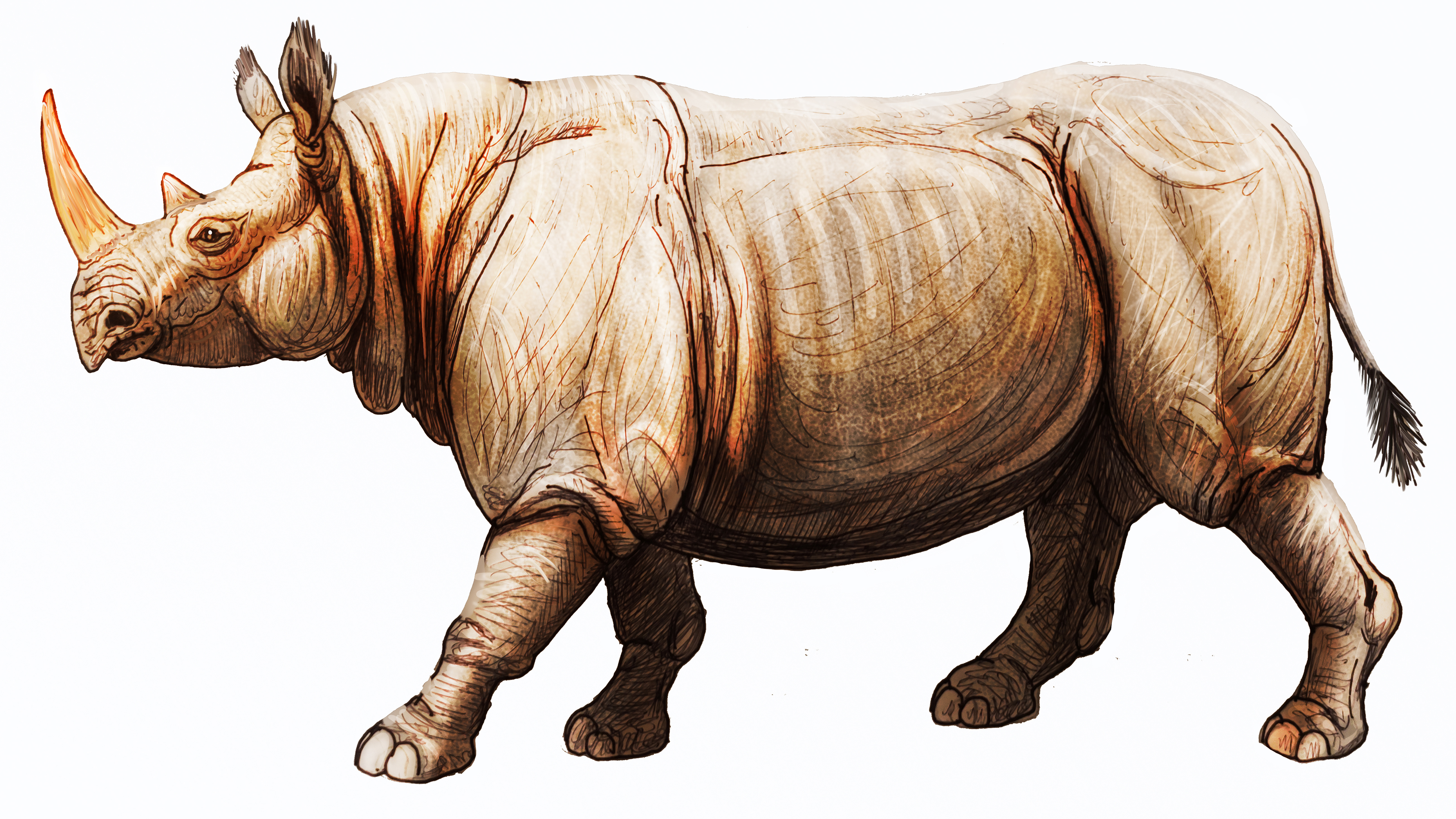
Life restoration

Morphological phylogeny after Pandolfi (2023), excluding living African rhinoceros species.

- - Rhinocerotina
    - - Gaindatherium browni
      - Lartetotherium sansaniense
    - - - Nesorhinus
          - Nesorhinus hayasakai
          - Nesorhinus philippinensis
        - Rhinoceros
          - Rhinoceros sondaicus (Javan rhinoceros)
          - Rhinoceros unicornis (Indian rhinoceros)
      - - Dicerorhinus
          - Dicerorhinus gwebinensis
          - - Dicerorhinus fusuiensis
            - Dicerorhinus sumatrensis (Sumatran rhinoceros)
        - - Dihoplus schleiermacheri
          - - "Dihoplus" pikermiensis
            - - Coelodonta
                - Coelodonta thibetana
                - - Coelodonta nihowanensis
                  - - Coelodonta tologoijensis
                    - Coelodonta antiquitatis (woolly rhinoceros)
              - - Pliorhinus
                  - Pliorhinus megarhinus
                  - Pliorhinus miguelcrusafonti
                - Stephanorhinus
                  - Stephanorhinus jeanvireti
                  - - Stephanorhinus etruscus
                    - - Stephanorhinus hundsheimensis
                      - - Stephanorhinus hemitoechus (Narrow-nosed or steppe rhinoceros)
                        - Stephanorhinus kirchbergensis (Merck's or forest rhinoceros)

== Ecology ==
D. pikermiensis and D. bethlehemsis are suggested to have been browsers.
