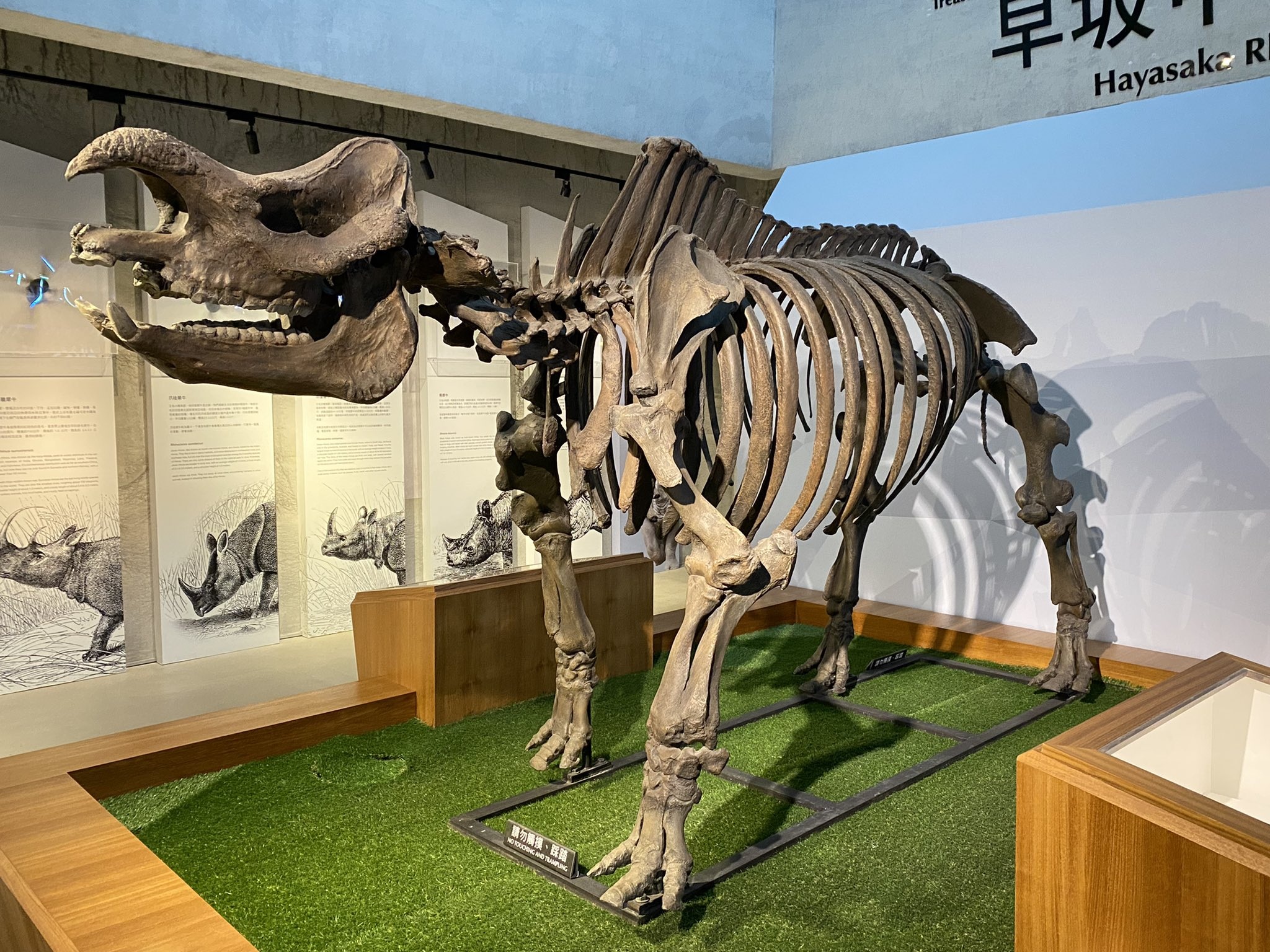
- Skeletal mount of N. hayasakai

Scientific classification
- Kingdom: Animalia
- Phylum: Chordata
- Class: Mammalia
- Order: Perissodactyla
- Family: Rhinocerotidae
- Subfamily: Rhinocerotinae
- Tribe: Rhinocerotini
- Subtribe: Rhinocerotina
- Genus: †Nesorhinus; Antoine et al., 2021

Type species
- Nesorhinus philippinensis (von Koenigswald, 1956)

Other species
- N. hayasakai (Otsuka & Lin, 1984)

= Nesorhinus =

Nesorhinus Temporal range: Early Pleistocene–Middle Pleistocene

Extinct genus of rhinoceros from the Pleistocene of the Philippines and Taiwan

Nesorhinus is an extinct genus of rhinoceroses from the Pleistocene of Asia. It contains two species, Nesorhinus philippinensis (formerly Rhinoceros philippinensis) from Luzon, Philippines and N. hayasakai (formerly Rhinoceros sinensis hayasakai) from Taiwan.

== Discovery ==
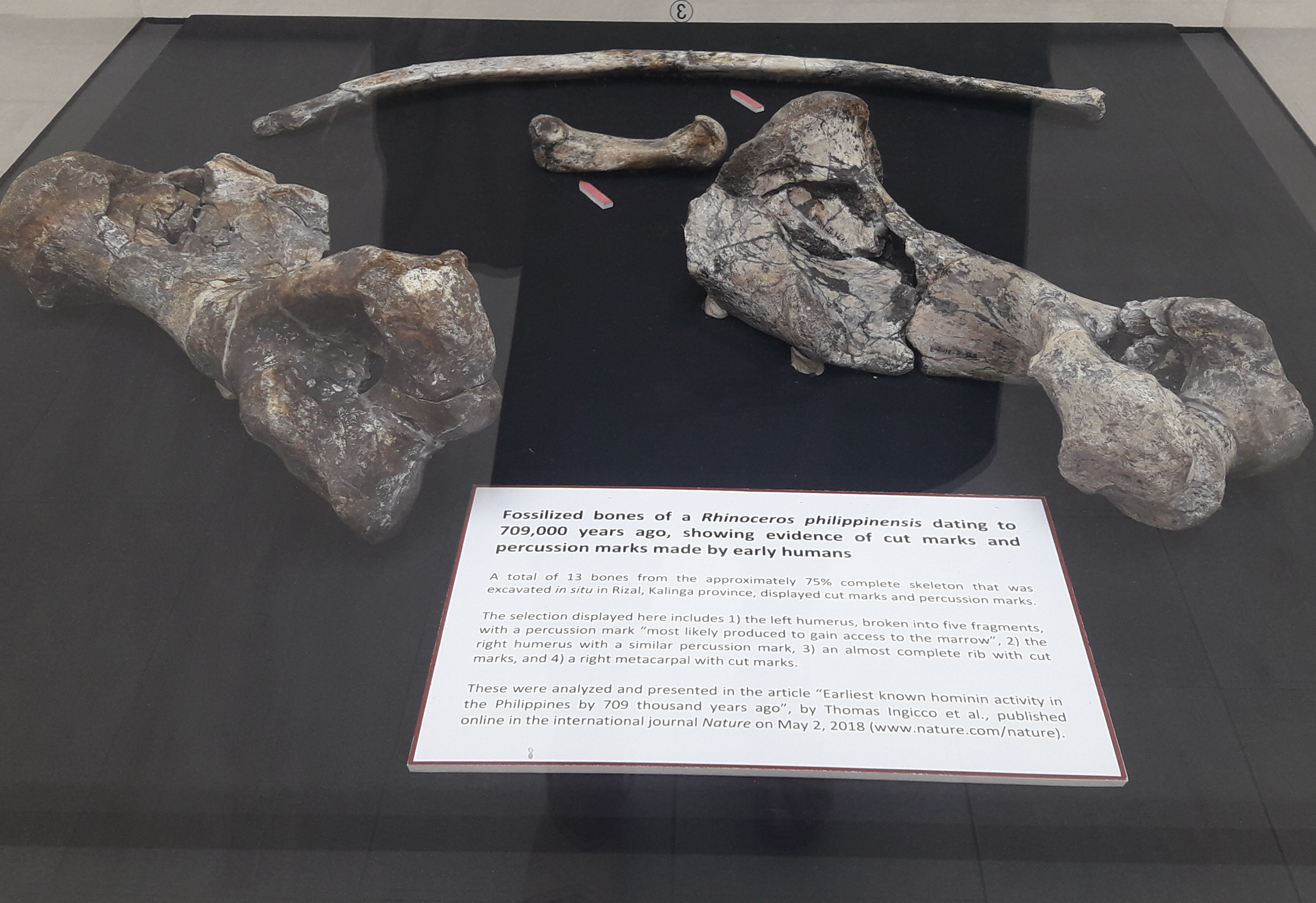
Bones of N. philippinensis from the Kalinga site

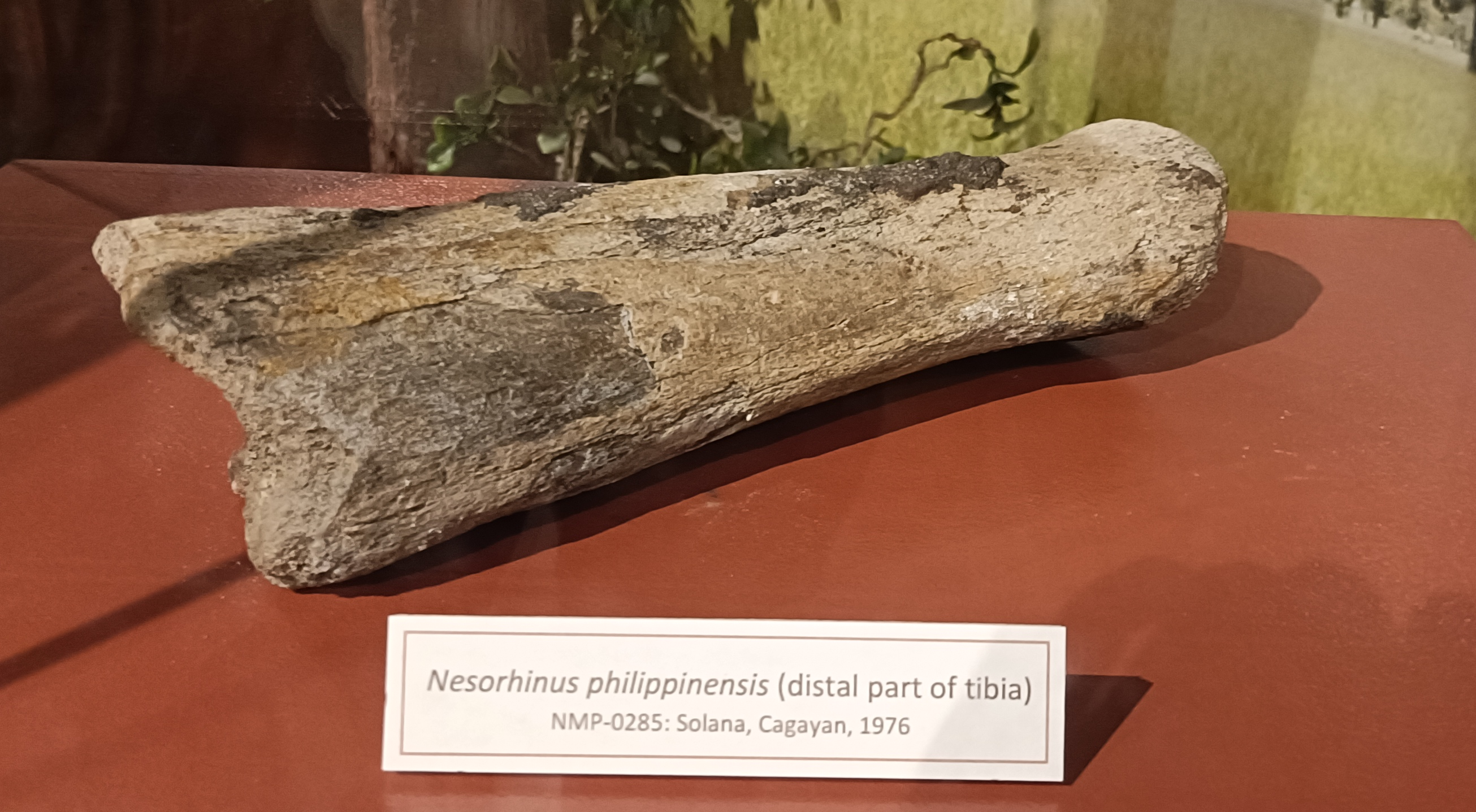
Distal part of tibia of the N. philippinensis

Nesorhinus philippinensis was first described by Gustav Heinrich Ralph von Koenigswald in 1956 as Rhinoceros philippinensis based on fossil teeth that were excavated in Cagayan province of Luzon island in the Philippines in 1936. These bones were lost and he did not provide for a holotype. A fossilized jaw of N. philippinensis was unearthed by Mr. de Asis on May 13, 1965 in the Fort Bonifacio area. The specimen was unearthed from an ash deposit produced by the volcano called the Guadalupe Formation. The specimen had a length of 12.07 cm (4.75 in), width of 6.87 cm (2.70 in), and a thickness of 9.47 cm (3.73 in). It has a weight of 800 grams (28 oz).

A 75% complete fossil of the N. philippinensis was unearthed in Rizal, Kalinga along with 57 stone tools in 2014. A 2018 study placed the date of the rhino fossil at around 709,000 years old (dating to the early Middle Pleistocene) after the rhino's tooth enamel was subjected to electron spin resonance dating. The authors of the study found butchery marks on the bones of the ribs, metacarpals, and both humeri, suggesting that the rhino had been butchered by early humans or hominins. While no bones from any hominin were reported from the site, over 50 stone tools found in context with the rhinoceros provided direct evidence for human activities at the site. It was declared the type species of the new genus Nesorhinus in 2021.

The earliest record of rhino fossils in Taiwan dates back to 1926, when Sato collected mandibular bone and molars from Neizha of Daxi Street (present-day Daxi District, Taoyuan City). A few years later, Ichiro Hayasaka of Taihoku Imperial University also rediscovered a more complete mandible near the site of Sato's specimen. In 1942, Hayasaka pointed out that in addition to Daxi, other sites like Dakeng (present-day Dakeng, Beitun District, Taichung City), Zuojhenzhuang (present-day Zuojhen District, Tainan City), and Qihou (present-day Qijin District, Kaohsiung City) are all suspected to have records of new fossil species of Rhinoceros.

In 1971, when the fossil collector Chang-Wu Pan visited Zuojhen, he received several fossilized rhinoceros teeth from a local elementary school student, Shih-Ching Chen, who had found them in the riverbed of Cailiao River. Pan and Chen investigated where the rhinoceros teeth were found and speculated that the fossils had been washed out of the mudrock layer along the riverbed, and that rhinoceros fossils might remain in the rock layer. This discovery was conveyed to Prof. Chao-Chi Lin of National Taiwan University. In December 1971, a team was formed by Taiwan Provincial Museum, including Prof. Chao-Chi Lin, Chang-Wu Pan, and Chun-Mu Chen (a well-known fossil collector from Zuojhen) to conduct the first excavation in Zuojhen to excavate rhinoceros fossils, including teeth and limb bones, but some limb bones were still preserved in the original stratum. In 1972, the team was joined by Japanese paleontologists Tokio Shikama and Hiroyuki Otsuka for the second excavation, and the remaining limb bones were excavated. The species was named as R. sinensis hayasakai by Otsuka & Lin in 1984, named in honour of Ichiro Hayasaka. It is known remains found in Taiwan dating to the Early and Middle Pleistocene.

== Description ==
Both species are relatively small, and comparable in size to living Sumatran and Javan rhinoceroses, with shoulder heights of 123–131 cm (4.04–4.30 ft), with Nesorhinus hayasaki being somewhat larger than N. philippinensis with an estimated body mass around 1,018–1,670 kg (2,244–3,682 lb), in comparison to 998–1,185 kg (2,200–2,612 lb) estimated for N. philippinensis. N. hayasakai has three autapomorphic features, all of which are present on the teeth - presence of crochet on P2-4, absence of lingual cingulum on the upper molars, and trigonid on the lower cheek teeth are acutely dihedral in the occlusal plane.

== Evolution ==
Nesorhinus is suggested to have island-hopped from the Asian mainland to Taiwan and Luzon sometime during the Late Miocene or later, probably from the Asian mainland to Taiwan and then from Taiwan to Luzon. It has been suggested to be closely related to the genus Rhinoceros, which contains the living Indian rhinoceros and Javan rhinoceros.

Bayesian morphological phylogeny after Pandolfi, 2023 Note: This excludes living African rhinoceros species.

- - Rhinocerotina
    - - Gaindatherium browni
      - Lartetotherium sansaniense
    - - - Nesorhinus
          - Nesorhinus hayasakai
          - Nesorhinus philippinensis
        - Rhinoceros
          - Rhinoceros sondaicus (Javan rhinoceros)
          - Rhinoceros unicornis (Indian rhinoceros)
      - - Dicerorhinus
          - Dicerorhinus gwebinensis
          - - Dicerorhinus fusuiensis
            - Dicerorhinus sumatrensis (Sumatran rhinoceros)
        - - Dihoplus schleiermacheri
          - - "Dihoplus" pikermiensis
            - - Coelodonta
                - Coelodonta thibetana
                - - Coelodonta nihowanensis
                  - - Coelodonta tologoijensis
                    - Coelodonta antiquitatis (woolly rhinoceros)
              - - Pliorhinus
                  - Pliorhinus megarhinus
                  - Pliorhinus miguelcrusafonti
                - Stephanorhinus
                  - Stephanorhinus jeanvireti
                  - - Stephanorhinus etruscus
                    - - Stephanorhinus hundsheimensis
                      - - Stephanorhinus hemitoechus (Narrow-nosed or steppe rhinoceros)
                        - Stephanorhinus kirchbergensis (Merck's or forest rhinoceros)

== Paleoecology ==
The fossils of Nesorhinus hayasakai from Zuojhen belong to the Chiting Formation, which is a interbedded sandstone and shale facies, with a geological age around 990,000 to 460,000 years ago (Early to Middle Pleistocene). The fossils from the Chiting Formation suggest that the habitat of the Nesorhinus hayasakai was probably an open grassland, and the animals in the ecosystem are collectively known as the Chochen fauna, which includes large animals such as mammoths, Elaphurus, wild boars, Rhinopithecus, Homotherium, Toyotamaphimeia that cohabitated with the N. hayasakai. On Luzon, N. philippinensis co-inhabited with the dwarf Stegodon species Stegodon luzonensis, as well as Philippine deer.

== See also ==
- Prehistory of the Philippines
