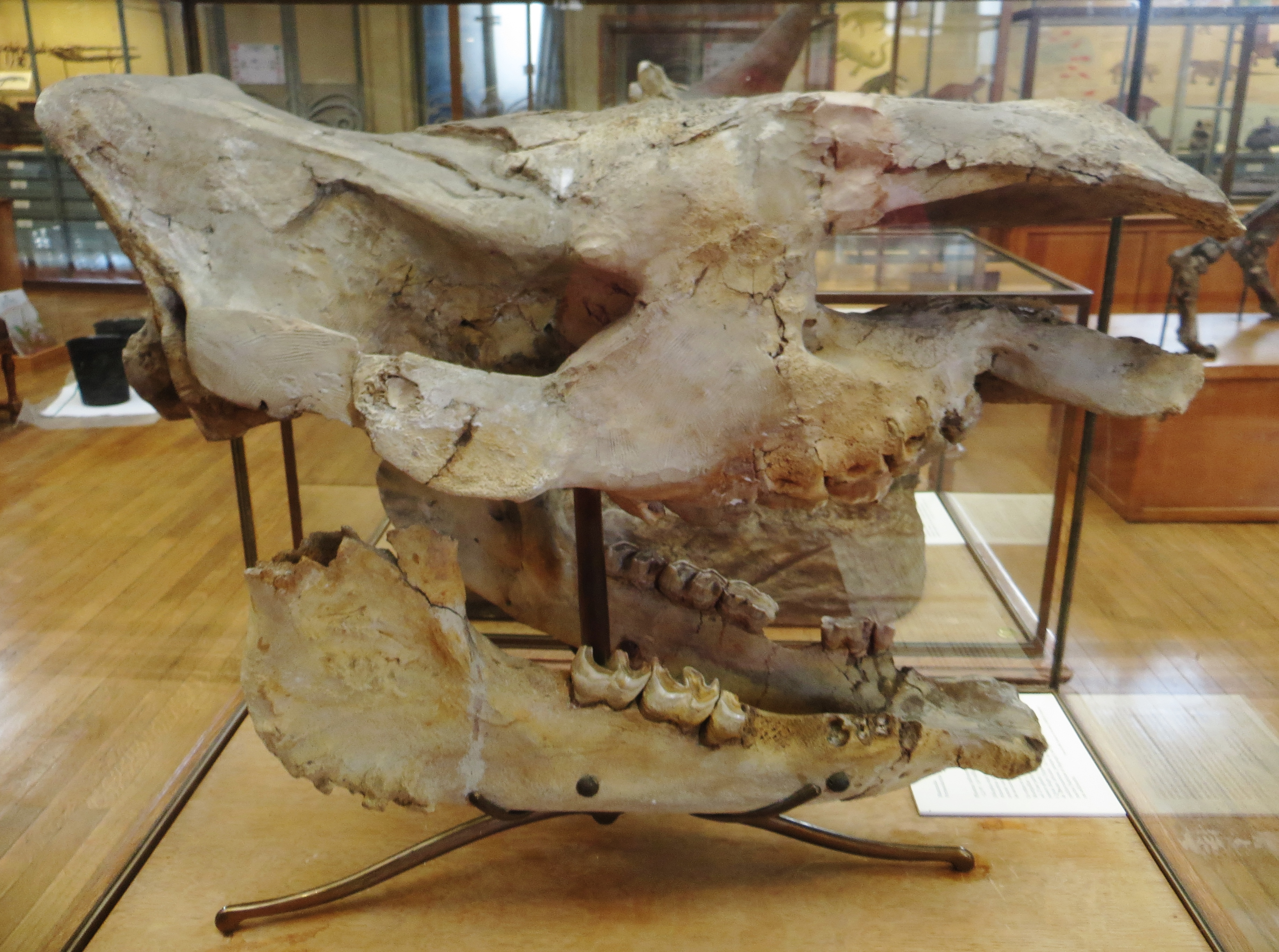
- Skull of Pliorhinus megarhinus at the Gallery of Paleontology and Comparative Anatomy, Paris.

Scientific classification
- Kingdom: Animalia
- Phylum: Chordata
- Class: Mammalia
- Infraclass: Placentalia
- Order: Perissodactyla
- Family: Rhinocerotidae
- Subfamily: Rhinocerotinae
- Tribe: Rhinocerotini
- Subtribe: Rhinocerotina
- Genus: †Pliorhinus; Pandolfi et al., 2021

Species
- Pliorhinus megarhinus (de Christol, 1834) (type); Pliorhinus miguelcrusafonti (Guérin & Santafé-Lopis, 1978); Pliorhinus ringstoemi (Arambourg, 1959)

= Pliorhinus =

Pliorhinus Temporal range: Late Miocene–Pliocene

Extinct genus of rhinoceros

Pliorhinus is an extinct genus of rhinoceros known from the Late Miocene and Pliocene of Eurasia. The type species, Pliorhinus megarhinus, was previously assigned to Dihoplus. Its validity is disputed, with some authors arguing its species belong in Stephanorhinus.

== Description ==
Species of Pliorhinus are large sized two horned rhinoceroses, with some individuals of P. megarhinus suggested to have a body mass of around 3,000 kilograms (6,600 lb). Their skulls have a nasal notch located above the molars, and are distinguished from other rhinoceroses by various characters of the teeth. P. megarhinus is noted for having a relatively flat skull roof.

== Taxonomy ==
The genus was named in 2021 to accommodate two species that had previously been included in a wide variety of rhinoceros genera, including Dihoplus and Stephanorhinus.

- P. megarhinus (de Christol, 1834) known from the Late Miocene-Pliocene of Europe, Anatolia, and Transbaikalia, spanning from around 6.7-3.5 million years ago.
- P. miguelcrusafonti (Guérin & Santafé-Lopis, 1978) known from the Pliocene of Europe
- P. ringstoemi (Arambourg, 1959), Late Miocene of China. (previously synonymised with P. megarhinus, but now regarded as distinct)

Species of Pliorhinus are suggested to be closely related and possibly ancestral to Stephanorhinus.

Morphological phylogeny after Pandolfi (2023), excluding living African rhinoceros species.

- - Rhinocerotina
    - - Gaindatherium browni
      - Lartetotherium sansaniense
    - - - Nesorhinus
          - Nesorhinus hayasakai
          - Nesorhinus philippinensis
        - Rhinoceros
          - Rhinoceros sondaicus (Javan rhinoceros)
          - Rhinoceros unicornis (Indian rhinoceros)
      - - Dicerorhinus
          - Dicerorhinus gwebinensis
          - - Dicerorhinus fusuiensis
            - Dicerorhinus sumatrensis (Sumatran rhinoceros)
        - - Dihoplus schleiermacheri
          - - "Dihoplus" pikermiensis
            - - Coelodonta
                - Coelodonta thibetana
                - - Coelodonta nihowanensis
                  - - Coelodonta tologoijensis
                    - Coelodonta antiquitatis (woolly rhinoceros)
              - - Pliorhinus
                  - Pliorhinus megarhinus
                  - Pliorhinus miguelcrusafonti
                - Stephanorhinus
                  - Stephanorhinus jeanvireti
                  - - Stephanorhinus etruscus
                    - - Stephanorhinus hundsheimensis
                      - - Stephanorhinus hemitoechus (Narrow-nosed or steppe rhinoceros)
                        - Stephanorhinus kirchbergensis (Merck's or forest rhinoceros)

== Ecology ==
P. megarhinus is suggested to have been a browser or mixed feeder.
