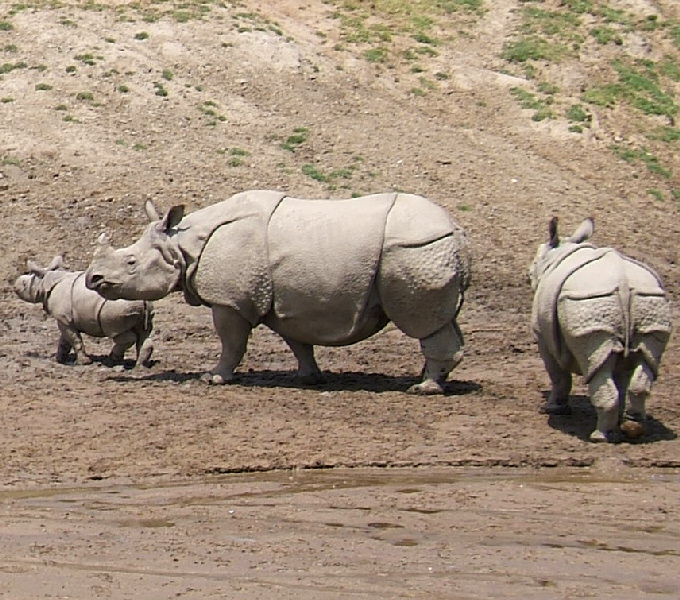
- Indian rhinoceros (R. unicornis)

Scientific classification
- Kingdom: Animalia
- Phylum: Chordata
- Class: Mammalia
- Order: Perissodactyla
- Family: Rhinocerotidae
- Tribe: Rhinocerotini
- Genus: Rhinoceros; Linnaeus, 1758

Type species
- Rhinoceros unicornis Linnaeus, 1758

Species
- R. unicornis; R. sondaicus

= Rhinoceros (genus) =

Rhinoceros Temporal range: Late Miocene-recent 9–0 Ma

Genus of mammals

Rhinoceros is a genus comprising one-horned rhinoceroses. This scientific name was proposed by Swedish taxonomist Carl Linnaeus in 1758. The genus contains two species, the Indian rhinoceros (R. unicornis) and the Javan rhinoceros (R. sondaicus). Although both members are threatened, the Javan rhinoceros is one of the most endangered large mammals in the world, with only 60 individuals surviving in Java (Indonesia).

== Etymology ==
The generic name Rhinoceros comes from the Ancient Greek words ῥινο- (rhino-), meaning "of the nose" and κέρας (kerás), meaning "horn".

== Classification ==
The genus Rhinoceros comprises:

- Indian rhinoceros (R. unicornis) Linnaeus, 1758 Indian subcontinent
- Javan rhinoceros (R. sondaicus) Desmarest, 1822 Southeast Asia
- †R. sivalensis Falconer and Cautley, 1846 northern Indian subcontinent (Siwalik Hills) Pliocene-Early Pleistocene
- †R. platyrhinus Falconer and Cautley 1847 syn Punjabitherium Khan (1971) Upper Siwaliks, Indian subcontinent, Early Pleistocene to early Middle Pleistocene, India. Largest species in the genus.
- †R. sinensis Owen, 1870 has been used as a wastebasket taxon used to refer to rhinoceros material from the Pleistocene of China, with various specimens belong to other Rhinoceros species, Dicerorhinus and Stephanorhinus, though it is possible that some remains attributed to Rhinoceros sinensis represents a valid and distinct species of Rhinoceros.
- †R. sinhaleyus Deraniyagala, 1936 and †R. kagavena Deraniyagala, 1956 have both been found in Late Pleistocene strata in Sri Lanka.

The earliest remains of the genus are known from the Late Miocene, represented by remains such as an indeterminate species found in deposits in Myanmar dating to around 8-9 million years ago.

The species "Rhinoceros" philippinensis from the early Middle Pleistocene of the Philippines and "Rhinoceros" sinensis hayasakai from the Early-Middle Pleistocene of Taiwan have been transferred to Nesorhinus, which appears to be closely related to Rhinoceros. While Rhinoceros fusuiensis Yan et al. 2014 from the Early Pleistocene of South China has been transferred to Dicerorhinus.

Relationships among Late Pleistocene and modern rhinoceros genera, based on nuclear DNA, after Liu et al, 2021:

- - Elasmotheriinae
    †Elasmotherium sibiricum
  - Rhinocerotinae
    - - Black rhinoceros (Diceros bicornis)
      - White Rhinoceros (Ceratotherium simum)
    - - Rhinoceros
        - Indian rhinoceros (Rhinoceros unicornis)
        - Javan rhinoceros (Rhinoceros sondaicus)
      - - Sumatran rhinoceros (Dicerorhinus sumatrensis)
        - - † Woolly rhinoceros (Coelodonta antiquitatis)
          - † Merck's rhinoceros (Stephanorhinus kirchbergensis)

Bayesian morphological phylogeny after Pandolfi, 2023 Note: This excludes living African rhinoceros species.

- - Rhinocerotina
    - - Gaindatherium browni
      - Lartetotherium sansaniense
    - - - Nesorhinus
          - Nesorhinus hayasakai
          - Nesorhinus philippinensis
        - Rhinoceros
          - Rhinoceros sondaicus (Javan rhinoceros)
          - Rhinoceros unicornis (Indian rhinoceros)
      - - Dicerorhinus
          - Dicerorhinus gwebinensis
          - - Dicerorhinus fusuiensis
            - Dicerorhinus sumatrensis (Sumatran rhinoceros)
        - - Dihoplus schleiermacheri
          - - "Dihoplus" pikermiensis
            - - Coelodonta
                - Coelodonta thibetana
                - - Coelodonta nihowanensis
                  - - Coelodonta tologoijensis
                    - Coelodonta antiquitatis (woolly rhinoceros)
              - - Pliorhinus
                  - Pliorhinus megarhinus
                  - Pliorhinus miguelcrusafonti
                - Stephanorhinus
                  - Stephanorhinus jeanvireti
                  - - Stephanorhinus etruscus
                    - - Stephanorhinus hundsheimensis
                      - - Stephanorhinus hemitoechus (Narrow-nosed or steppe rhinoceros)
                        - Stephanorhinus kirchbergensis (Merck's or forest rhinoceros)
