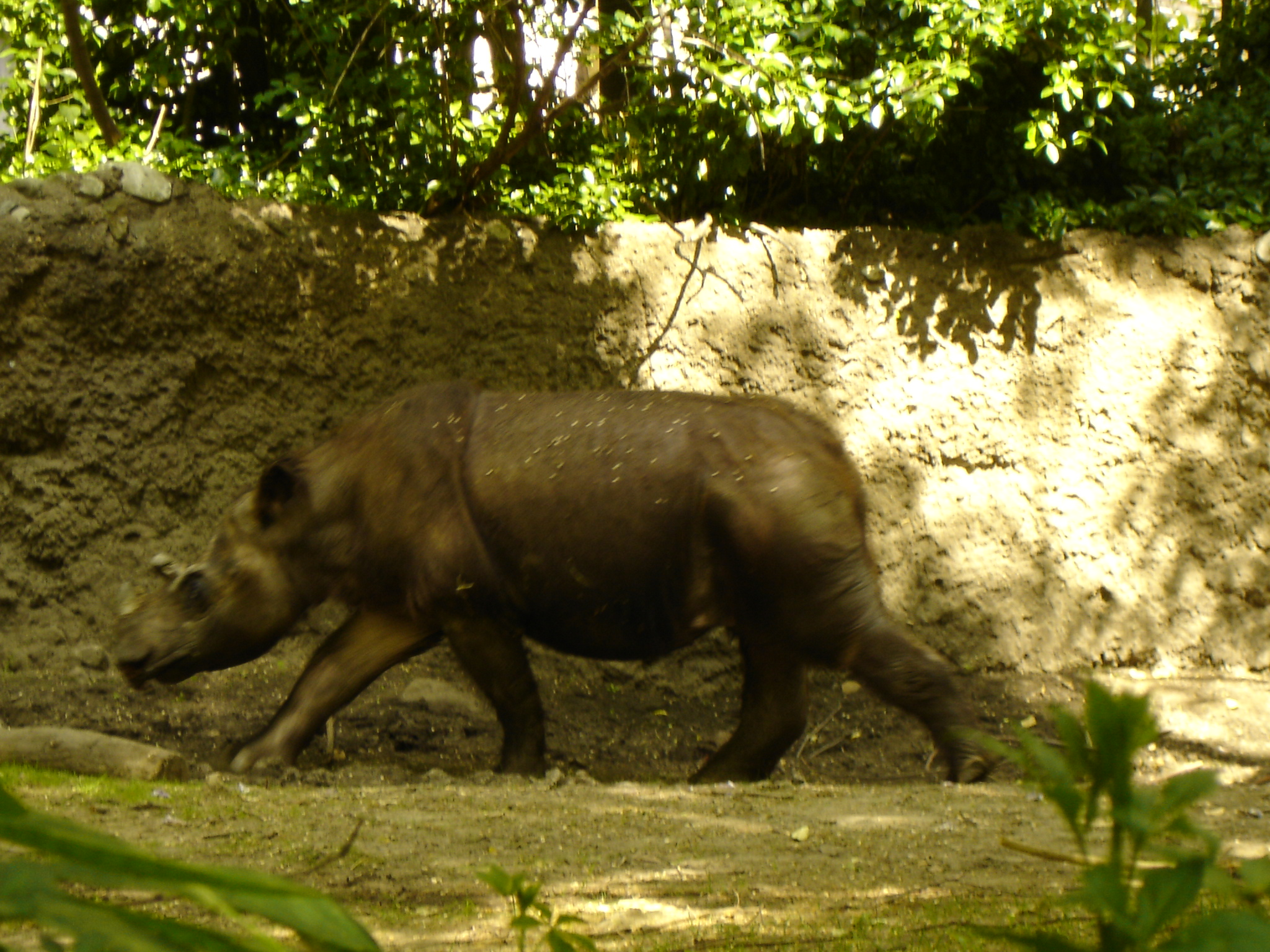
- Rapunzel, a Sumatran Rhino in the Bronx Zoo

Scientific classification
- Kingdom: Animalia
- Phylum: Chordata
- Class: Mammalia
- Infraclass: Placentalia
- Order: Perissodactyla
- Family: Rhinocerotidae
- Tribe: Dicerorhinini
- Genus: Dicerorhinus; Gloger, 1841

Species
- †Dicerorhinus fusuiensis; †Dicerorhinus gwebinensis; Dicerorhinus sumatrensis

= Dicerorhinus =

Dicerorhinus Temporal range: Late Miocene–Recent

Genus of mammals

Dicerorhinus is a genus of the family Rhinocerotidae, consisting of a single extant species, the two-horned Sumatran rhinoceros (D. sumatrensis), and several extinct species. The genus likely originated from the Late Miocene of central Myanmar. Many species previously placed in this genus probably belong elsewhere.

== Taxonomy ==
Species provisionally considered valid include:

- †Dicerorhinus fusuiensis originally described as Rhinoceros fusuiensis Early Pleistocene, South China.
- †Dicerorhinus gwebinensis Zin-Maung-Maung-Thein et al., 2008 Known from a skull of Pliocene-Early Pleistocene age found in Myanmar. Some authors have considered the skull not distinguishable from that of D. sumatrensis.

Historically, Dicerorhinus was a wastebasket taxon. Revisions by several authors over the years have removed many species:

Transferred to Stephanorhinus

- Dicerorhinus merckii (synonym of Stephanorhinus kirchbergensis)
- Dicerorhinus hemitoechus
- Dicerorhinus etruscus
- Dicerorhinus yunchuchenensis
- Dicerorhinus jeanvireti
- Dicerorhinus choukoutienensis (synonym of Stephanorhinus kirchbergensis)
- Dicerorhinus orientalis (synonym of Stephanorhinus kirchbergensis)
- Dicerorhinus nipponicus (synonym of Stephanorhinus kirchbergensis)

Transferred to Dihoplus

- Dicerorhinus megarhinus
- Dicerorhinus schleiermacheri
- Dicerorhinus ringstroemi

Transferred to Caementodon

- Dicerorhinus caucasicus

Transferred to Lartetotherium

- Dicerorhinus sansaniensis
- Dicerorhinus cixianensis Chen and Wu, 1976

Transferred to Rusingaceros

- Dicerorhinus leakeyi

Placement of the Sumatran rhinoceros among recent and subfossil rhinoceros species based on nuclear genomes (Liu, 2021)

- - Elasmotheriinae
    †Elasmotherium sibiricum
  - Rhinocerotinae
    - - Black rhinoceros (Diceros bicornis)
      - White Rhinoceros (Ceratotherium simum)
    - - - Indian rhinoceros (Rhinoceros unicornis)
        - Javan rhinoceros (Rhinoceros sondaicus)
      - - Sumatran rhinoceros (Dicerorhinus sumatrensis)
        - - †Woolly rhinoceros (Coelodonta antiquitatis)
          - †Merck's rhinoceros (Stephanorhinus kirchbergensis)

Bayesian morphological phylogeny (Pandolfi, 2023) Note: This excludes living African rhinoceros species.

- - Rhinocerotina
    - - †Gaindatherium browni
      - †Lartetotherium sansaniense
    - - - †Nesorhinus
          - †Nesorhinus hayasakai
          - †Nesorhinus philippinensis
        - Rhinoceros
          - Rhinoceros sondaicus (Javan rhinoceros)
          - Rhinoceros unicornis (Indian rhinoceros)
      - - Dicerorhinus
          - †Dicerorhinus gwebinensis
          - - †Dicerorhinus fusuiensis
            - Dicerorhinus sumatrensis (Sumatran rhinoceros)
        - - †Dihoplus schleiermacheri
          - - †"Dihoplus" pikermiensis
            - - †Coelodonta
                - †Coelodonta thibetana
                - - †Coelodonta nihowanensis
                  - - †Coelodonta tologoijensis
                    - †Coelodonta antiquitatis (woolly rhinoceros)
              - - †Pliorhinus
                  - †Pliorhinus megarhinus
                  - †Pliorhinus miguelcrusafonti
                - †Stephanorhinus
                  - †Stephanorhinus jeanvireti
                  - - †Stephanorhinus etruscus
                    - - †Stephanorhinus hundsheimensis
                      - - †Stephanorhinus hemitoechus (Narrow-nosed or steppe rhinoceros)
                        - †Stephanorhinus kirchbergensis (Merck's or forest rhinoceros)
