= Rusingaceros =

Rusingaceros Temporal range: Early Miocene, 17.5 Ma

Scientific classification
- Kingdom: Animalia
- Phylum: Chordata
- Class: Mammalia
- Order: Perissodactyla
- Family: Rhinocerotidae
- Subtribe: Rhinocerotina
- Genus: †Rusingaceros; Geraads, 2010

Type species
- †Rusingaceros leakeyi (Hooijer, 1966 [originally Dicerorhinus leakeyi])

Extinct genus of mammals

Rusingaceros or Dicerorhinus leakeyi is an extinct genus of rhinocerotid known from the Miocene of Rusinga Island, Kenya.

== Discovery ==
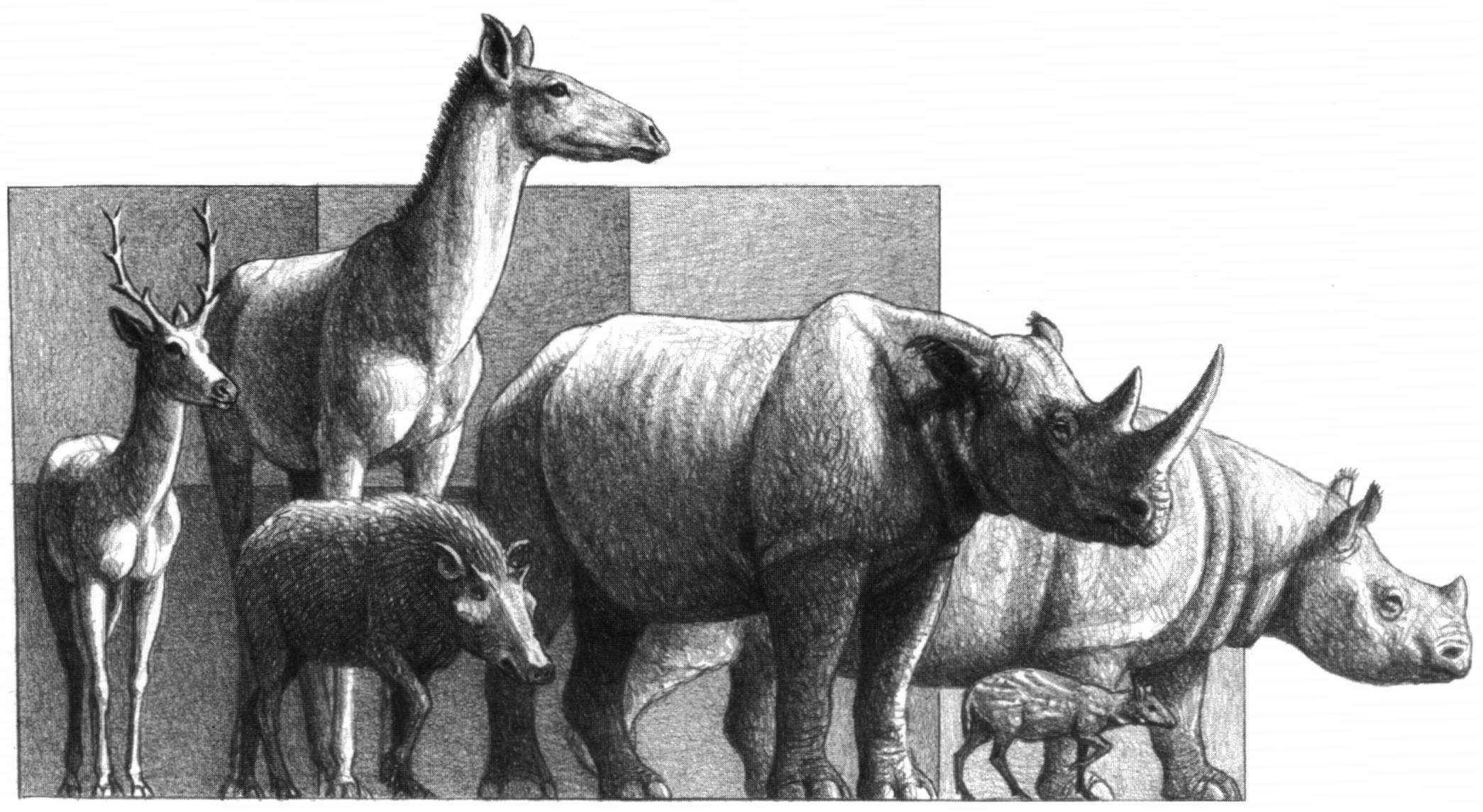
Early Miocene ungulates from Eastern Africa, including Rusingaceros (middle)

Rusingaceros is known from the holotype KNM-RU 2821, an almost perfectly preserved skull and associated mandible and from the paratype KNM-RU 2822, a maxilla and associated mandible. Both specimen were collected in the early Miocene site (Burdigalian stage) of Rusinga located in Lake Victoria in Kenya, from the Kulu Formation, dating to about 17.5 million years ago. Additional specimens described by Hooijer in 1966 from the Songhor and Napak localities, as well as more recently reported occurrences, are highly fragmentary and based mostly on isolated teeth. Rusingaceros represents the earliest rhino "of modern type, i.e., with a strong nasal and smaller frontal horn". This suggests that Rusingaceros belongs to subtribe Rhinocerotina, within the tribe Rhinocerotini.

== Etymology ==
Rusingaceros was first named by Denis Geraads in 2010 and the type species is Rusingaceros leakeyi. It was originally described by Hooijer in 1966 as a new species of Dicerorhinus. The generic name is derived from the name of Rusinga Island, and from Greek ceros, "horn", thus, the name means "Rusinga Island's horn". The specific name honors Leakey.
