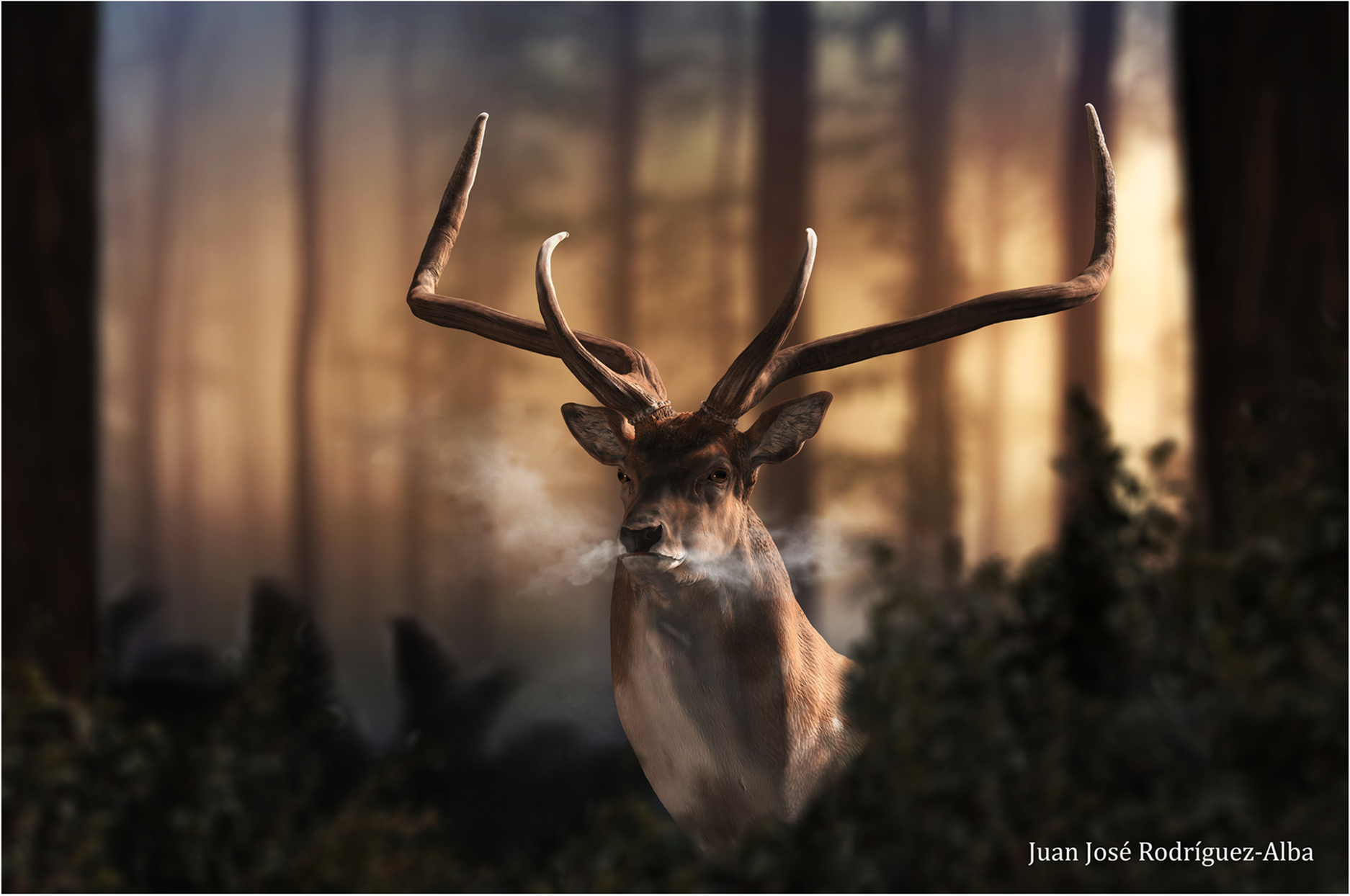

Scientific classification
- Domain: Eukaryota
- Kingdom: Animalia
- Phylum: Chordata
- Class: Mammalia
- Order: Artiodactyla
- Family: Cervidae
- Genus: Dama
- Species: †D. celiae

Binomial name
- †Dama celiae van der Made et al., 2023

= Dama celiae =

Dama celiae Temporal range: Middle Pleistocene

Extinct species of deer

Dama celiae is an extinct species of the genus Dama that inhabited the Iberian Peninsula during the Middle Pleistocene.

== Description ==
Dama celiae is primarily known from antler material, as well as scapulas and metatarsals. Unlike modern fallow deer, Dama celiae has pointed antlers that lack palmation. It has a large, prominent brow (first and lowest) tine which curves upwards, and branches close to the base of the antler. The main beam of the antler lacks branching, and is directed backwards and outwards. Based on the size of the metatarsals D. celiae may have been larger than living fallow deer, and more comparable in size to Dama clactoniana.

== Distribution ==
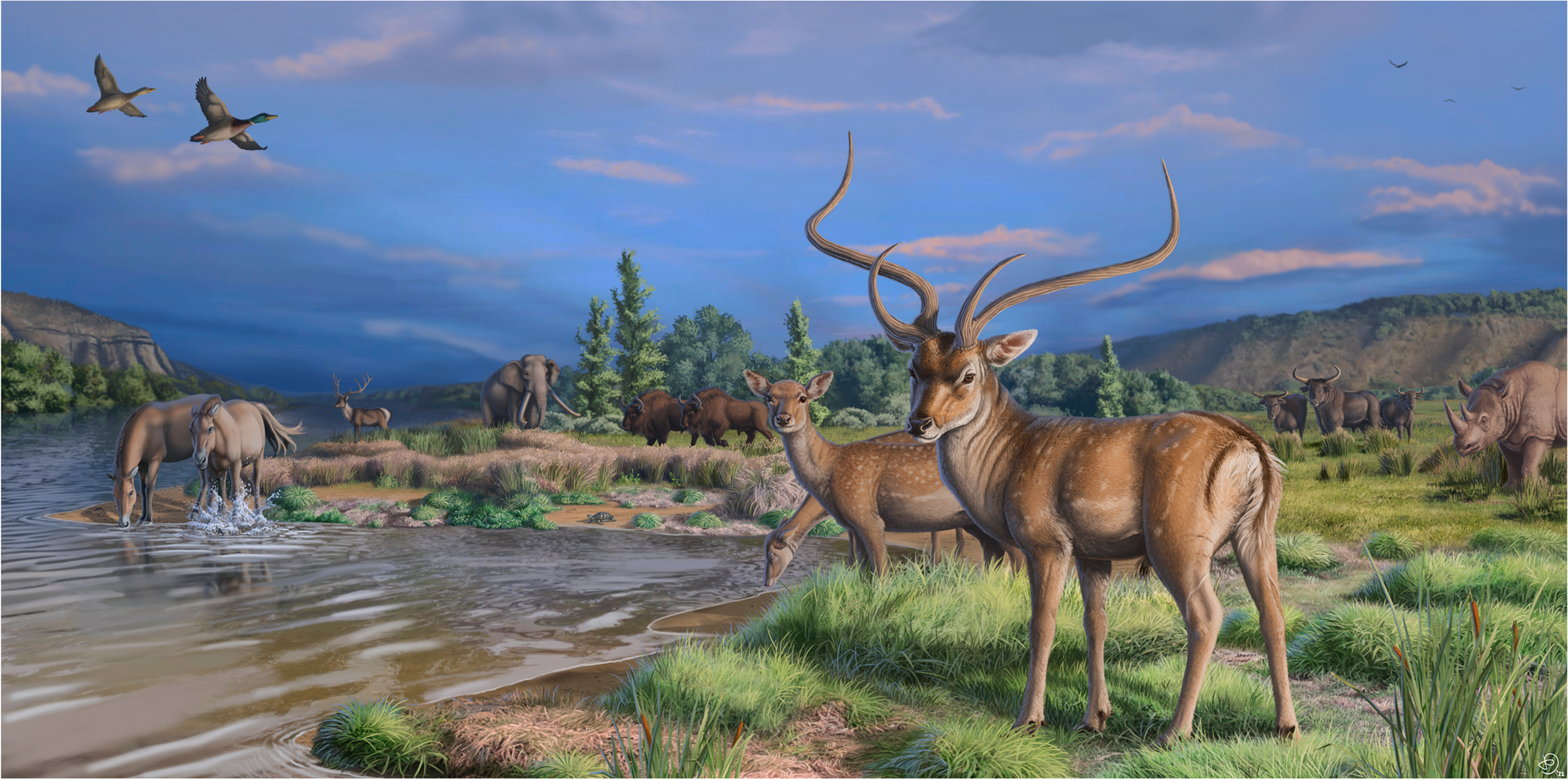
Middle Pleistocene landscape with Dama celiae and other megafauna, including straight-tusked elephant, narrow-nosed rhinoceros, bison, aurochs and wild horse

Dama celiae is known from two sites in Spain, Pedro Jaro I and Orcasitas, which date back to MIS 9 (~300,000 years ago). At these localities it co-occurs with animals like the straight-tusked elephant, aurochs, wild horse, European wild ass, bison, narrow-nosed rhinoceros, wild boar and cave lions, as well as another species of deer, Megaloceros matritensis.

== Relationship with humans ==
Remains likely of D. celiae have been found with cut marks, indicating that they were butchered and probably hunted by archaic humans, likely early Neanderthals who produced an Acheulean stone tool industry at the sites where D. celiae is found.
