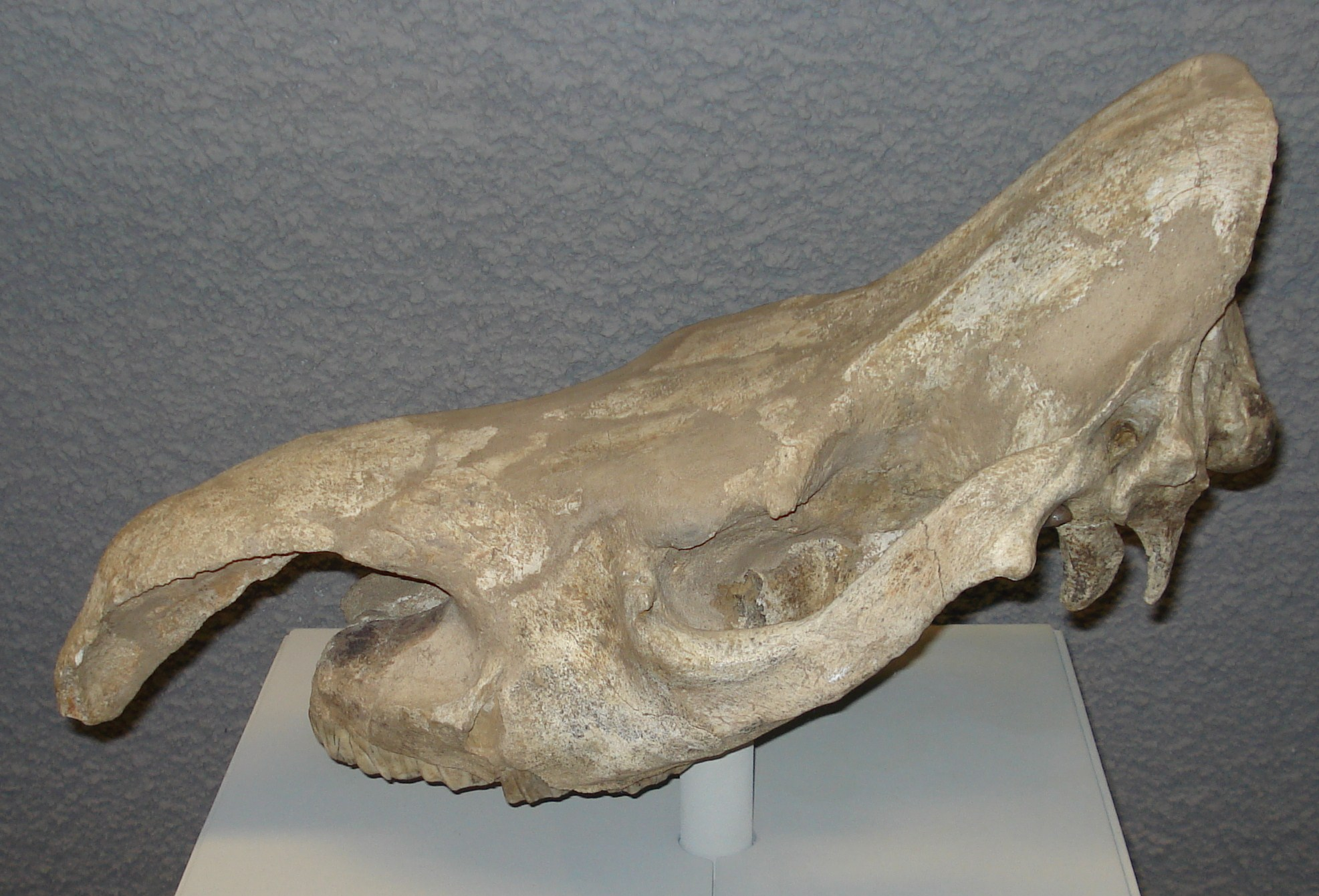
- Skull of Stephanorhinus hemitoechus
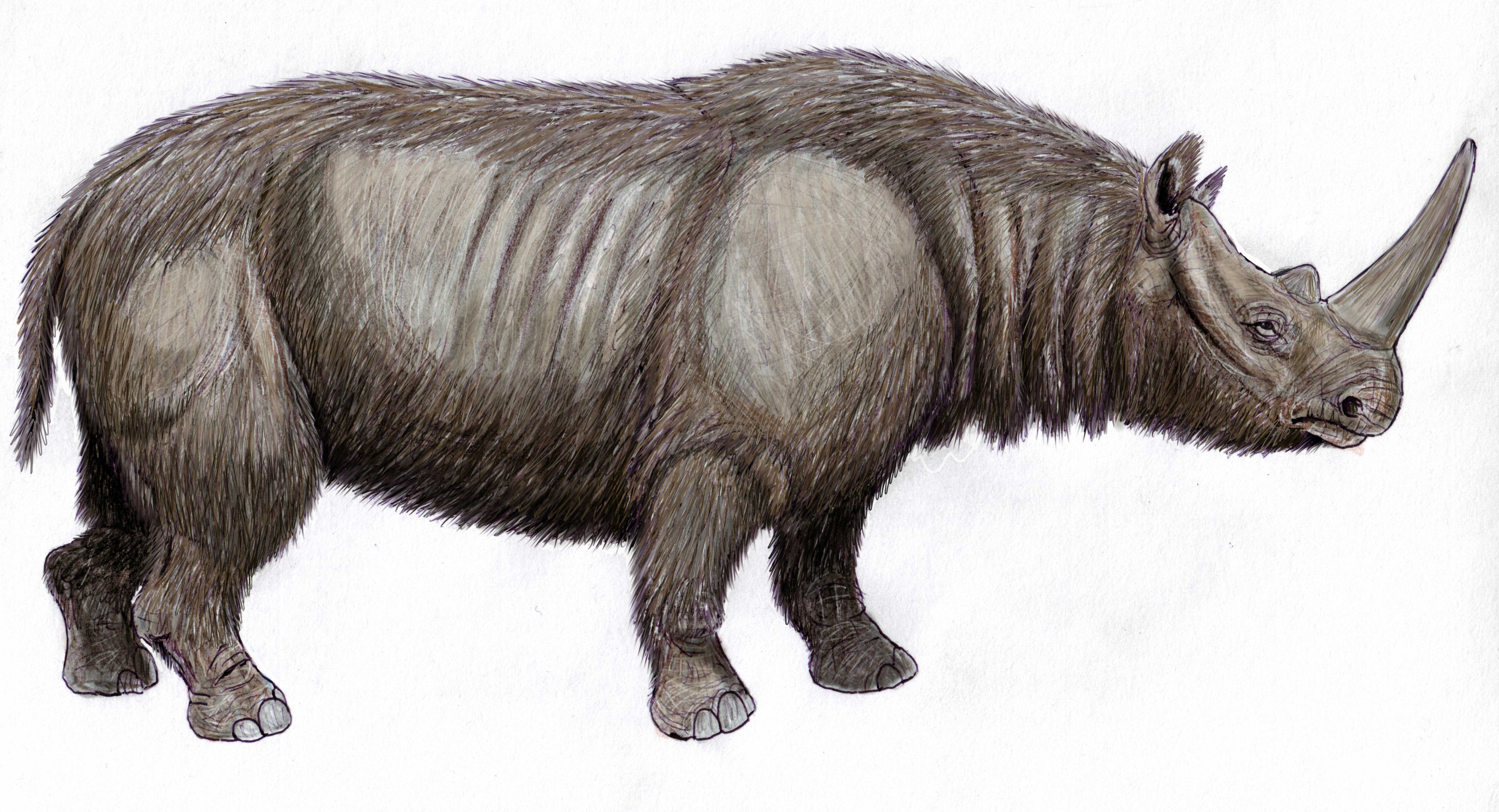
- Stephanorhinus hemitoechus life restoration

Scientific classification
- Kingdom: Animalia
- Phylum: Chordata
- Class: Mammalia
- Order: Perissodactyla
- Family: Rhinocerotidae
- Genus: †Stephanorhinus
- Species: †S. hemitoechus

Binomial name
- †Stephanorhinus hemitoechus (Falconer in Gaudin, 1859)
- Range of Stephanorhinus hemitoechus (blue) and Stephanorhinus kirchbergensis (red), with overlapping range in purple

Synonyms
- Dicerorhinus hemitoechus Falconer, 1859; Rhinoceros hemitoechus Falconer, 1859; Rhinoceros binagadensis Dzhafarov, 1955; Rhinoceros subinermis Pomel, 1895

= Narrow-nosed rhinoceros =

Narrow-nosed rhinoceros Temporal range: Middle Pleistocene–Late Pleistocene ~500,000-34,000/15,500 years ago.

Extinct species of rhinoceros

The narrow-nosed rhinoceros (Stephanorhinus hemitoechus), also known as the steppe rhinoceros, is an extinct species of rhinoceros belonging to the genus Stephanorhinus that lived in western Eurasia, including Europe, and West Asia, as well as North Africa during the Pleistocene. It first appeared in Europe around 500,000 years ago during the Middle Pleistocene and survived there until 34,000 years Before Present, possibly surviving as late as 15,500 years ago in the Middle East. On average around 1,500 kilograms (3,300 lb) in weight, it was comparable in size to the living black rhinoceros. The species was native to temperate and Mediterranean environments, ranging from forest to grasslands, where it fed on low growing plants and to a lesser extent woody plants. It reached its maximum geographical extent during interglacial periods, when its range would extend at least as far north as Germany and northern England. It was one of the last species of Stephanorhinus alongside Merck's rhinoceros (S. kirchbergensis), with the two species occurring alongside each other in some parts of Europe and the Caucasus. Evidence has been found that the narrow-nosed rhinoceros was exploited for food by archaic humans, including Neanderthals. Like other Stephanorhinus species, its closest living relative is the Sumatran rhinoceros.

== History of research and taxonomy ==
The species was originally described by Hugh Falconer in 1859 as Rhinoceros hemitoechus, based on remains found in cave deposits in Glamorgan, south Wales in Great Britain, dating to the Eemian/Last interglacial, around 130-115,000 years ago. The lectotype specimen (the singular type specimen later selected from an original series of type specimens) is a partial posterior half of a skull (NHML M48953), held in the Natural History Museum of London, which was collected from Minchin Hole, on the southeast coast of the Gower Peninsula in southwest Glamorgan.

The species name refers to the shape of its nasal septum, which is partially closed. In Falconer's 1868 posthumously published memoir describing S. hemitoechus, another partial posterior portion of the skull of the species of unknown age, purchased by the British Museum in 1846, now also held in the collections of the London Natural History Museum (under the specimen number PV OR 20013) likely collected from somewhere in Northamptonshire, central England was compared to the skull from Minchin Hole.

The lectotype has often erroneously historically asserted to be the specimen NHMUK 27836, also held in the London Natural History Museum, a skull collected from Middle Pleistocene sediments in the vicinity of Clacton on the east coast of England, and assigned to the species Rhinoceros leptorhinus by Richard Owen in 1846 (Rhinoceros leptorhinus was originally named by Georges Cuvier in 1822 for unrelated older rhinoceros remains from Italy). Although 1868 is often given as the date of the publication, this is incorrect, as publications by W.B. Dawkins (1867) and Gaudin (1859) indicate Falconer had coined the name prior to this.

The narrow-nosed rhinoceros, like other Stephanorhinus species was often previously assigned historically to the genus Dicerorhinus, which includes the Sumatran rhinoceros, which genetic evidence indicates is the closest living relative of Stephanorhinus.

Truncated cladogram of Rhinocerotinae, showing the position of the narrow-nosed rhinoceros relative to living and Pleistocene rhinocerotine species based on morphological and genetic data, after Borrani et al. 2025.

- Rhinocerotinae
  - Dicerotini
    - White rhinoceros (Ceratotherium simum)
    - Black rhinoceros (Diceros bicornis)
  - - - Indian rhinoceros (Rhinoceros unicornis)
      - Javan rhinoceros (Rhinoceros sondaicus)
    - Dicerorhinina
      - Sumatran rhinoceros (Dicerorhinus sumatrensis)
      - - Woolly rhinoceros (Coelodonta antiquitatis)
        - Stephanorhinus
          - Stephanorhinus megarhinus
          - - Stephanorhinus jeanvireti
            - - - Stephanorhinus miguelcrusafonti
                - - Stephanorhinus etruscus
                  - Stephanorhinus hundsheimensis
              - - Narrow-nosed rhinoceros (Stephanorhinus hemitoechus)
                - Merck's rhinoceros (Stephanorhinus kirchbergensis)

Several claimed subspecies of S. hemitoechus has been named, including Stephanorhinus hemitoechus falconeri named by Augusto Azzaroli in 1962, which included the aforementioned Clacton skull as its lectotype, as well as remains from Germany and Italy. Stephanorhinus hemitoechus aretinus was named by Azzaroli in the same year, and includes remains from Italy and England. Stephanorhinus hemitoechus intermedius was named by Azzaroli in 1987, and includes remains from Italy. A 2025 review found all claimed subspecies of S. hemitoechus to be invalid, and that the differences were due to individual variation, as well as stage of growth and sex.

== Description ==
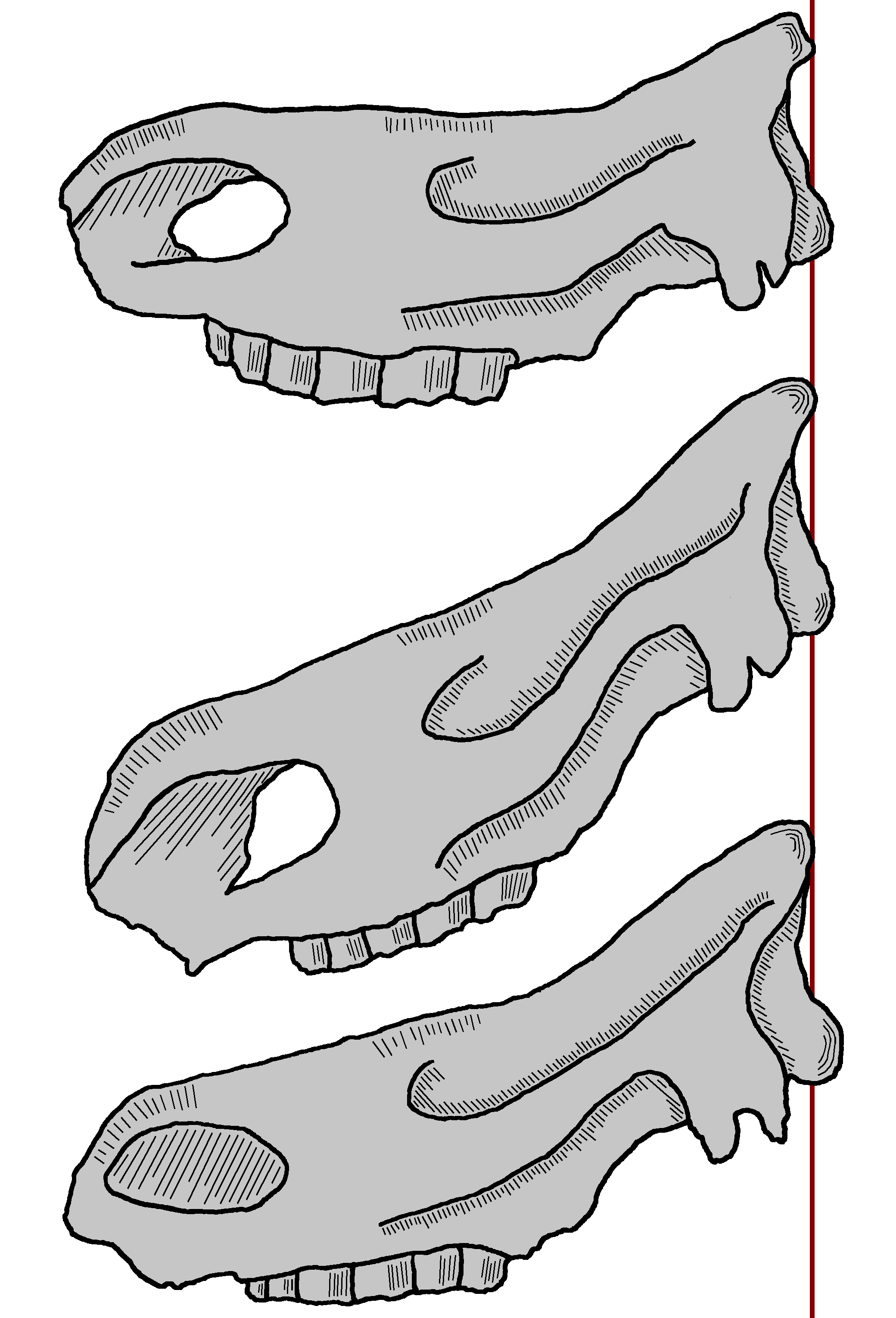
Skulls of the narrow-nosed rhinoceros (middle) compared to S. kirchbergensis (top) and the woolly rhinoceros (bottom), showing the difference in head angle

The narrow-nosed rhinoceros was a large rhinoceros, though the size of the species was somewhat variable depending on local conditions. A 2016 study estimated an average body mass of 1,400–1,600 kilograms (3,100–3,500 lb) as a gross average across the sampled Western European populations, with sampled individuals body mass varying from 1,200 kilograms (2,600 lb) on the low end to 2,400 kilograms (5,300 lb) at maximum. A 2026 study estimated an average body mass of 1,850 ± 584 kilograms (4,079 ± 1,287 lb) for northern European populations and 1,739 ± 445 kilograms (3,834 ± 981 lb) for southern Europe, though they suggested this difference may not be statistically significant, with the total range spanning from 914 kilograms (2,015 lb) to 2,975 kilograms (6,559 lb). Compared to the earlier species S. jeanvireti, S. etruscus, and S. hundsheimensis the limb joints are relatively shallow, and the limb bones relatively broad and short.

The skull is low slung, with the cranium being downwardly directed. The nasal notch (narial incison) is deep, extending back as far as the first upper molar (M1). Like other Stephanorhinus species, the narrow-nosed rhinoceros had a long nasal region of the skull supported by a bony (ossified) nasal septum. Like other species of Stephanorhinus, S. hemitoechus is thought to have borne two horns, though the attachment regions for the horns are "weakly developed" similar to S. etruscus but unlike S. hundsheimensis.

As in other Stephanorhinus species, it lacked incisor teeth on both upper and lower jaws. similar to living black and white rhinoceroses. The teeth are relatively high crowned (hypsodont) compared to other Stephanorhinus species, with the third molars being relatively enlarged. The teeth are relatively shifted forwards in the jaw. The lower jaw is relatively slender in comparison to S. kirchbergensis, and tapers, becoming slender and narrow towards the front (the mandibular symphysis).

== Evolution and distribution ==
The earliest remains of the species in Europe date to the early-mid Middle Pleistocene, around 500,000 years ago, with one of the oldest if not the oldest record in Europe being from Campagna Romana near Rome in Central Italy, dating to Marine Isotope Stage 13. It is suggested to have evolved outside of Western Europe before later migrating into the region. The species may have evolved from the earlier Stephanorhinus etruscus, though other authors suggest it may have evolved from S. hundsheimensis.

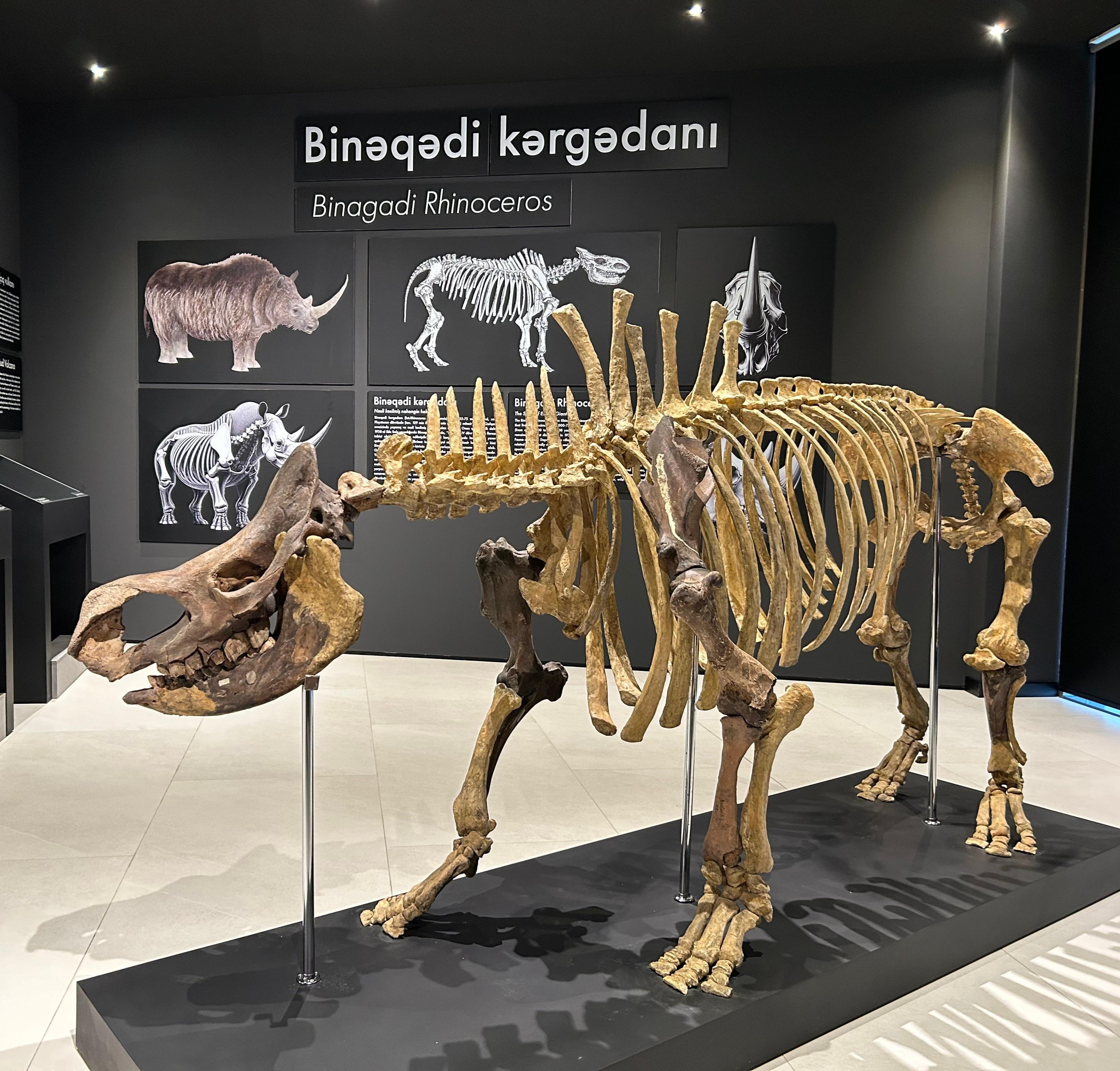
Skeleton attributed to "Rhinoceros binagadensis" from Azerbaijan, which is now recognised as a synonym of S. hemitoechus.

In comparison to the widespread Merck's rhinoceros (Stephanorhinus kirchbergensis), the narrow-nosed rhinoceros had a less geographically extensive distribution, including much of Europe, as well as West Asia and North Africa. In Europe the species is known from abundant remains across the Iberian Peninsula in the west (where S. kirchbergensis appears to have been rare or absent), eastwards to Italy (as far south as Apulia and Calabria), Croatia, Serbia, Bulgaria and Greece (possibly as far south as the Peloponnese). Its range extended northwards into northern France, Britain (as far north as North Yorkshire), the Netherlands, Germany and Slovakia during warm interglacial periods.

In North Africa, where the species was previously known as Rhinoceros subinermis, remains are known from the Maghreb in Morocco, northern Algeria, and possibly Haua Fteah cave in coastal northern Cyrenacia, northeast Libya (which were originally referred to S. kirchbergensis, which is no longer thought to have been present in Africa). In West Asia, the range of the species extends from the Levant, including Israel, Palestine, Lebanon, Jordan and Syria in the west, to western Iran, and Azerbaijan in the east, where some remains were previously referred to as the species Rhinoceros binagadensis.

== Ecology ==
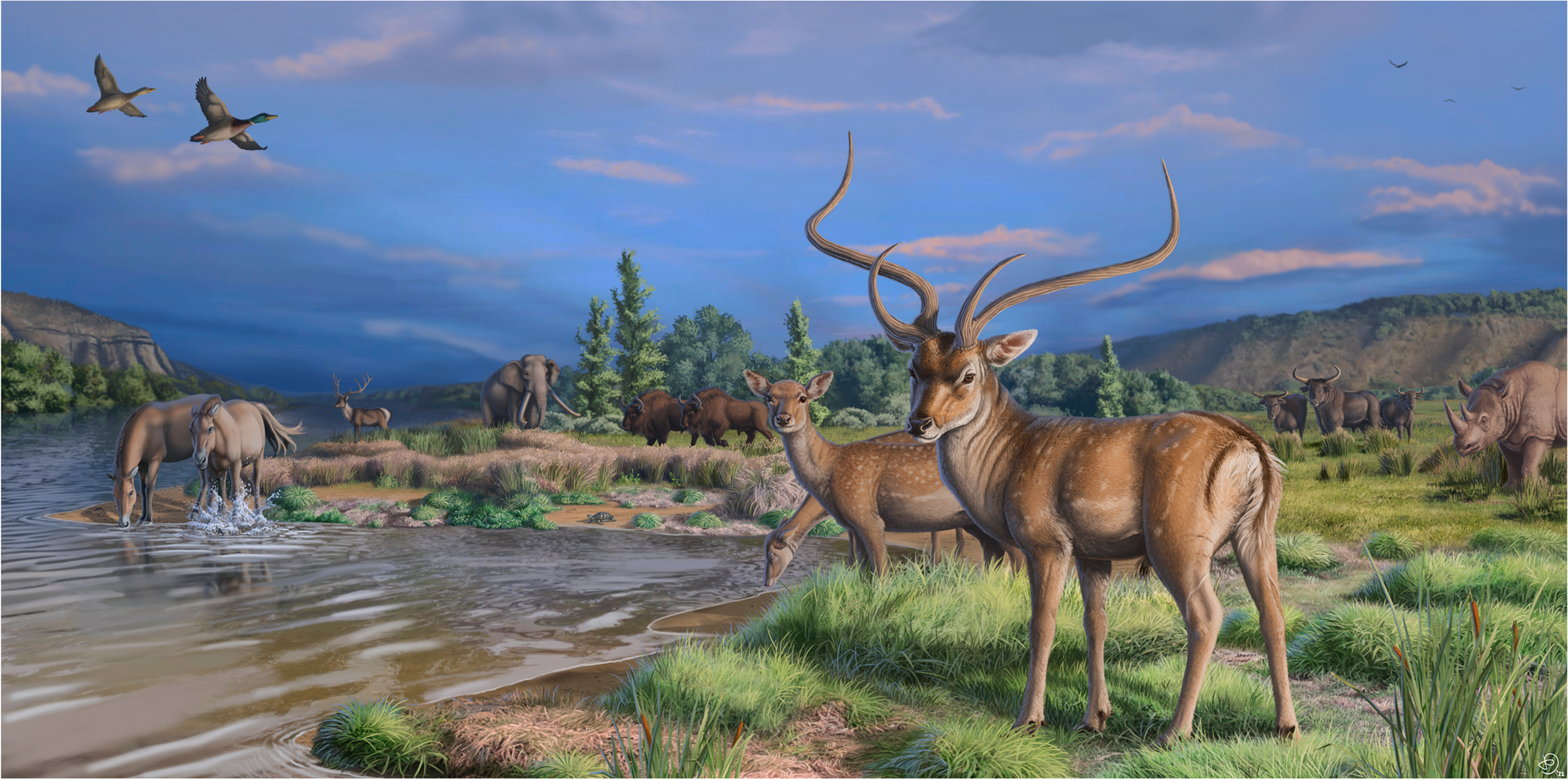
A Middle Pleistocene landscape in Spain, including the narrow-nosed rhinoceros (far right) as well the straight-tusked elephant (background centre-left), the extinct fallow deer Dama celiae (foreground) wild horse (left), bison, (background centre) and aurochs (background right)

The morphology of the skull suggests that the species was adapted towards a grazing diet. Tooth wear analysis suggests that the narrow-nosed rhinoceros had a variable diet tending towards grazing or mixed feeding, and clearly distinct from the more browsing focused diet inferred for S. kirchbergensis on average. A 2026 analysis across the species temporal span in Western Europe found an overall trend for mixed feeding. Although the species has been referred to as the "steppe rhinoceros" and presumed to have had a preference for open habitats, the species was ecologically plastic, and occurred in both open grasslands and forested environments. In Europe the species was found in temperate as well as cool climates, and seems to have been intolerant of cold climate conditions like those typically inhabited by the woolly rhinoceros. Its dietary flexibility likely helped it tolerate cool glacial periods. In the Middle East the species inhabited warm, open xeric habitats. In Lebanon, it is suggested to have generally had a mixed feeding diet that periodically saw a significant increase in browse consumption, with Lebanese populations of the narrow-nosed rhinoceros having tooth wear likely having a seasonally increased intake of "dust-laden or gritty low-lying vegetation, as well as bark stripping, or small branches and twigs feeding" plausibly corresponding to the end of the dry season during September-December when abundance of herbaceous vegetation significantly declined compared to the rest of the year.

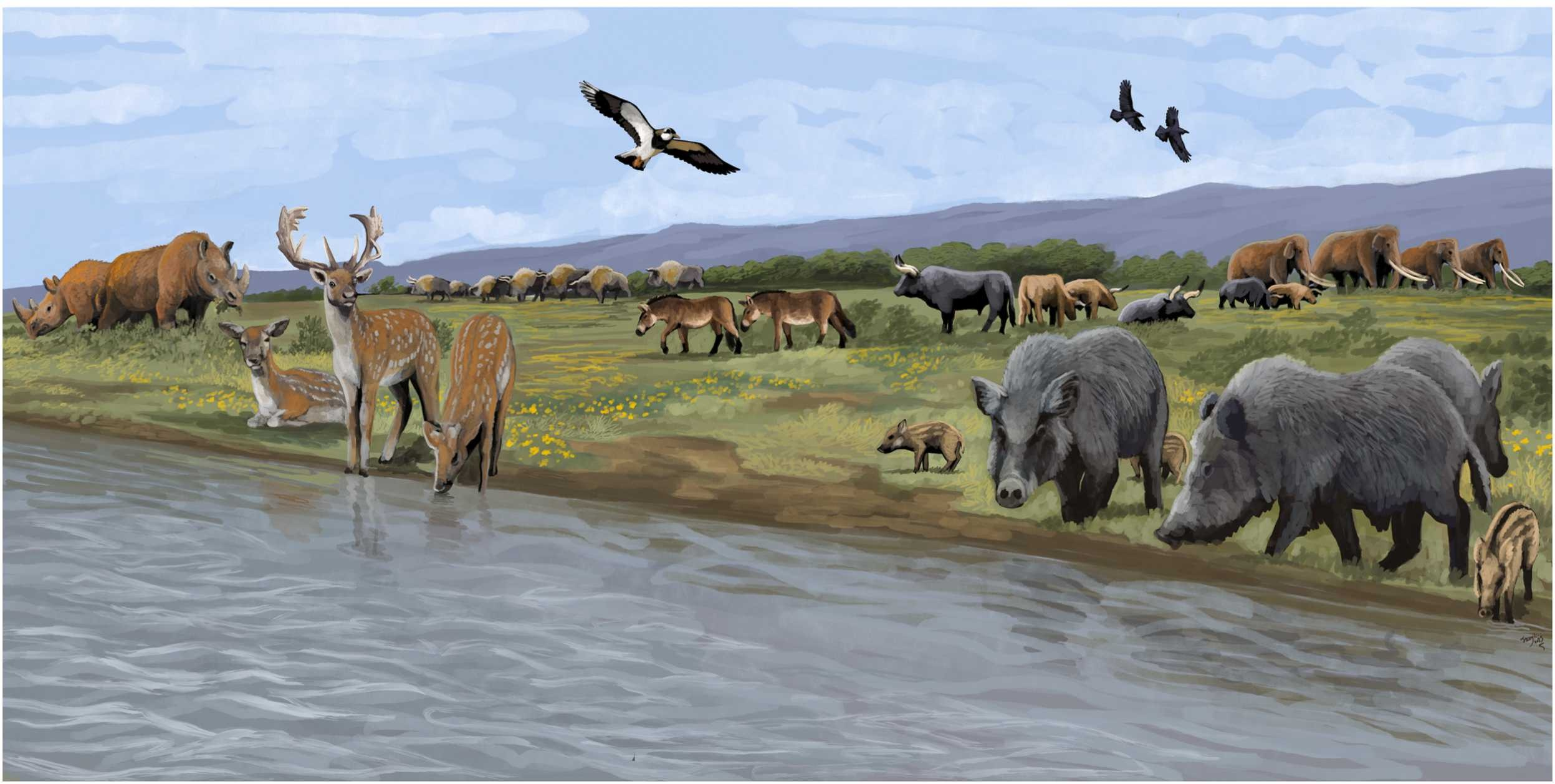
A European Last Interglacial landscape, featuring the narrow-nosed rhinoceros (far left) as well as European fallow deer (foreground left), wild boar (foreground right), steppe bison (background centre left), wild horse (background centre), aurochs (background centre right) and straight-tusked elephant (background right)

The narrow-nosed rhinoceros probably behaved similarly to living rhinoceroses. A 1993 study suggested that the species may have been sedentary (having a home range and not migratory) and territorial, and probably engaged in ritualized confrontations between males, which may have sometimes broken out into full-on fighting. A rib of a narrow-nosed rhinoceros from Neumark Nord in Germany has been found with a healed fracture, which may have been the result of such a fight.

In Europe, the narrow-nosed rhinoceros lived alongside other megafauna species, including both animals living today, like red deer, fallow deer, roe deer, wild boar, wolves, brown bears, leopards, wild horse and bison, and those that are extinct, like European wild ass, aurochs, cave hyena, Irish elk, cave lions and straight-tusked elephants. In the Middle East, it lived alongside lions, cave hyenas, leopards, mouflon, wild goat, gazelles, red and fallow deer, wild ass, aurochs, hippopotamus, camels, and elephants.

S. hemitoechus juveniles represented likely prey items for cave lions and cave hyenas at least on occasion. Remains of narrow-nosed rhinoceroses found in cave hyena dens may indicate scavenging or predation, with adult individuals probably more likely to have been scavenged that actively hunted.

== Relationship with humans ==
Finds at a number of sites suggest that the narrow-nosed rhinoceros was exploited for food by archaic humans. Specimens of S. hemitoechus from the Middle Pleistocene (Marine Isotope Stage 12,478,000-424,000 years ago) Arago Cave (Caune de l'Arago) site in Southern France shows extensive evidence of butchery (presumably by Tautavel Man, which is found at the same site). The ratios of skeletal elements implies that only the parts of the body with the most meat were carried to the site. The profile of ages of rhino bones in the cave resembles natural mortality curves, suggesting that there was not selective hunting, and the fact that marks of other carnivores are rare implies that the carcasses were acquired by hunting or active scavenging. At the Shishan Marsh site in the Azraq Oasis in northeast Jordan, dating to around 250,000 years ago, stone tools at the site have been found to have protein residue from the butchery of rhinoceroses. As S. hemitoechus is the only rhinoceros species known from the site, it is probable that it was the species butchered. Remains of narrow-nosed rhinoceros from the sites of Ras el-Kelb cave and Naame in coastal Lebanon, dating to c. 350-500,000 and 100,000 years ago respectively, are suggested to have been accumulated by human hunting.

At the late Middle Pleistocene Gran Dolina site in Spain, a handful of S. cf. hemitoechus bones display cut marks. At Biache-Saint-Vaast in northeast France, dating to MIS 7, around 240,000 years ago, remains of at least 33 individuals of S. hemitoechus, alongside those of brown bear and aurochs, were found in association with human artifacts, with a significant proportion displaying cut marks. The mortality profile, which is heavily skewed towards juveniles, with no old adults, may suggest selective hunting of juveniles by Neanderthals. At the collapsed cave of Payre in southeast France, dating to the late Middle Pleistocene, numerous remains of rhinoceroses, primarily S. kirchbergensis along with a smaller amount of S. hemitoechus have been found, which display marks indicative of butchery and are suggested to have been accumulated at the site by Neanderthals. The abundance of teeth found at the site (though other skull material is largely absent) suggests that the Neanderthals may have been using them as tools. Mortality profiles found that young and old individuals were the most abundant at the site. The late Middle Pleistocene sites of Great Yeldham and Grays Thurrock in southern Britain (both probably dating to around 300,000 years ago) where remains of S. hemitoechus have been found have also been suggested as butchery sites.

A skull from Cueva Des-Cubierta in central Spain, dating to the early-mid Late Pleistocene (MIS 4-early MIS 3, ~71-43,000 years ago), exhibits fracturing and cut marks consistent with butchery by Neanderthals. The missing pieces of the skull were not found in the cave, suggesting that it had been butchered off-site. It has been proposed that the skull was kept as a hunting trophy along with the skulls of aurochs and bison. Several other sites in Spain demonstrate the exploitation of S. hemitoechus by Neanderthals during the early-mid Late Pleistocene, including Navalmaíllo Rock Shelter (which represents a single individual brought to a hunting camp and butchered) and Abric Romani (minimum of two individuals). Exploitation of narrow-nosed rhinoceros by Neanderthals was relatively infrequent compared to other types of prey.

== Extinction ==
In North Africa, remains of the narrow-nosed rhinoceros are known dating between 109-53,000 years ago. In Europe, the narrow-nosed rhinoceros survived latest in the southern parts of its range. The last records in Italy date to around 41,000 years ago, while remains dating to 40,000 years ago are known from Bacho Kiro cave in Bulgaria. In Greece, a record from the banks of the Peneiós river in Thessaly has been dated to around 45-35,000 years ago. In the Iberian Peninsula, the latest directly dated records of the species date to approximately 34,000 years ago (Portalón del Tejadilla cave in Segovia, central Spain and Arbreda Cave in Girona, northeast Spain) with indirectly dated remains found at the cave of Gruta da Figueira Brava in southwest Portugal possibly dating to somewhat later, around 31-24,000 years ago. In the Levant, the species may have survived as recently as 15,500 years ago based on remains found in Hayonim Cave in northern Israel. Its extinction in southern Europe was suggested in a 2017 study to be due at least in part to climatic change causing habitat fragmentation resulting in population fragmentation, with small populations more likely to become extinct for a variety of reasons, "including loss of genetic variability, inbreeding, genetic drift, demographic fluctuations and environmental variations or natural catastrophes". The study found little evidence of systematic hunting of narrow-nosed rhinoceroses by humans at the time of its extinction. The unfavourable cold environmental conditions in Europe in the run-up to the Last Glacial Maximum may have forced it to compete with other herbivores on limited food resources.
