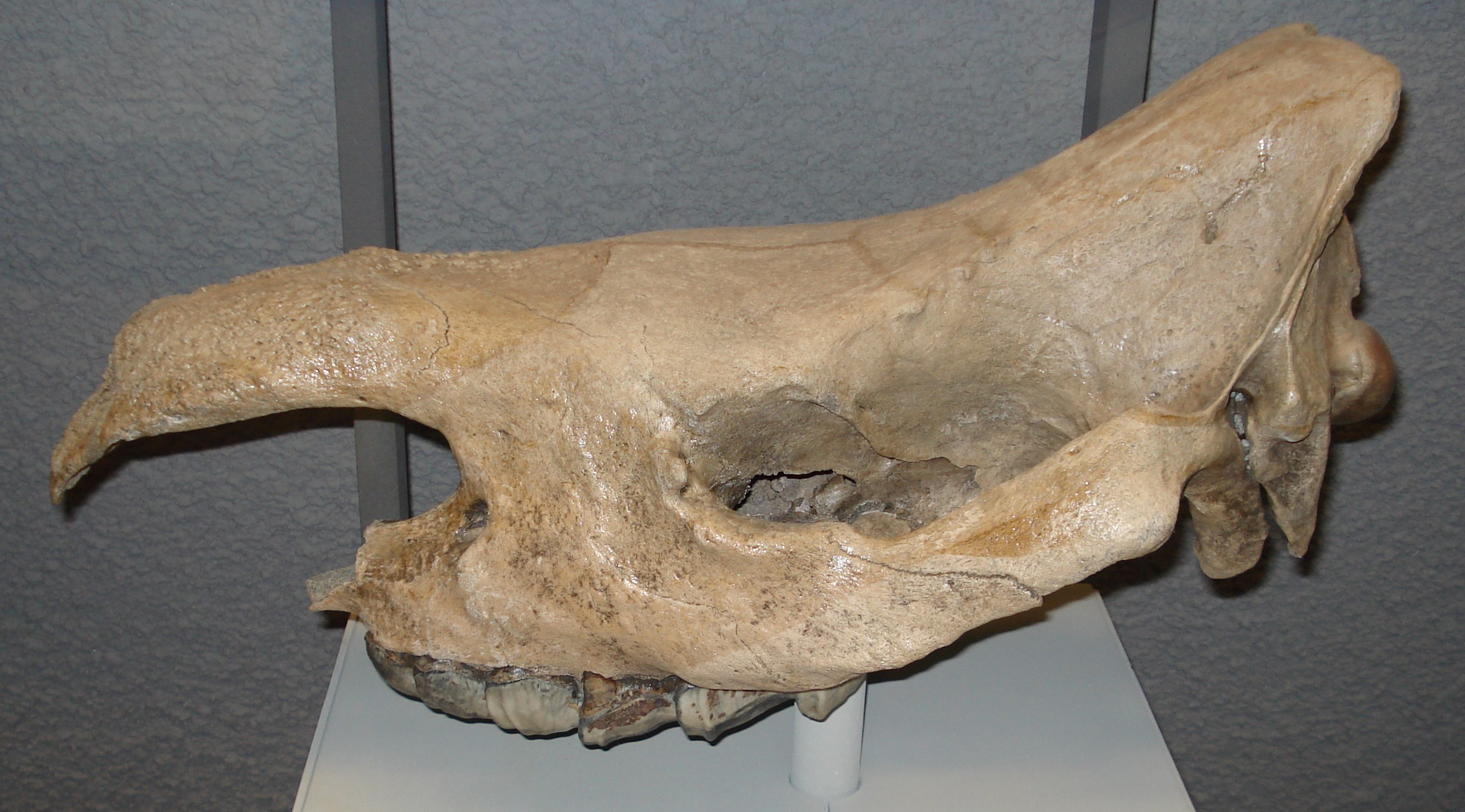
- Mostly complete skull from Germany
- Diagram of skull from Russia

Scientific classification
- Kingdom: Animalia
- Phylum: Chordata
- Class: Mammalia
- Order: Perissodactyla
- Family: Rhinocerotidae
- Genus: †Stephanorhinus
- Species: †S. kirchbergensis

Binomial name
- †Stephanorhinus kirchbergensis (Jäger, 1839)

Synonyms
- List: Coelodonta merckii (Kaup, 1841); Dicerorhinus merckii (Kaup, 1841); Dc. m. var. brachycephala Schroeder, 1903; Dc. kirchbergensis (Jäger, 1839); Dc. k. var. brachycephala Schroeder, 1903; Dihoplus kirchbergensis (Jäger, 1839); R. incisivus Merck, 1784; R. kirchbergense Jäger, 1839; R. leptorhinus Cuvier, 1836; R. megarhinus de Christol, 1834; R. merckii (or mercki, merki) Kaup, 1841; R. m. var. brachycephala Schroeder, 1903; R. (Tichorhinus) merckii (Kaup, 1841); Stephanorhinus yunchuchenensis (Chow, 1963); Dicerorhinus nipponicus

= Stephanorhinus kirchbergensis =

Stephanorhinus kirchbergensis Temporal range: Latest Early Pleistocene - Late Pleistocene

Extinct species of rhinoceros native to Eurasia during the Pleistocene

Stephanorhinus kirchbergensis, also known as Merck's rhinoceros (or, less commonly, the forest rhinoceros), is an extinct species of rhinoceros belonging to the genus Stephanorhinus that lived in Eurasia from the end of the Early Pleistocene (around 800,000 years ago) until its extinction in the Late Pleistocene (surviving until 40,000 years ago and possibly later). Its range spanned from Western Europe to East Asia. Among the last members of the genus, it co-existed alongside Stephanorhinus hemitoechus (the narrow-nosed or steppe rhinoceros) in the western part of its range.

== Description ==
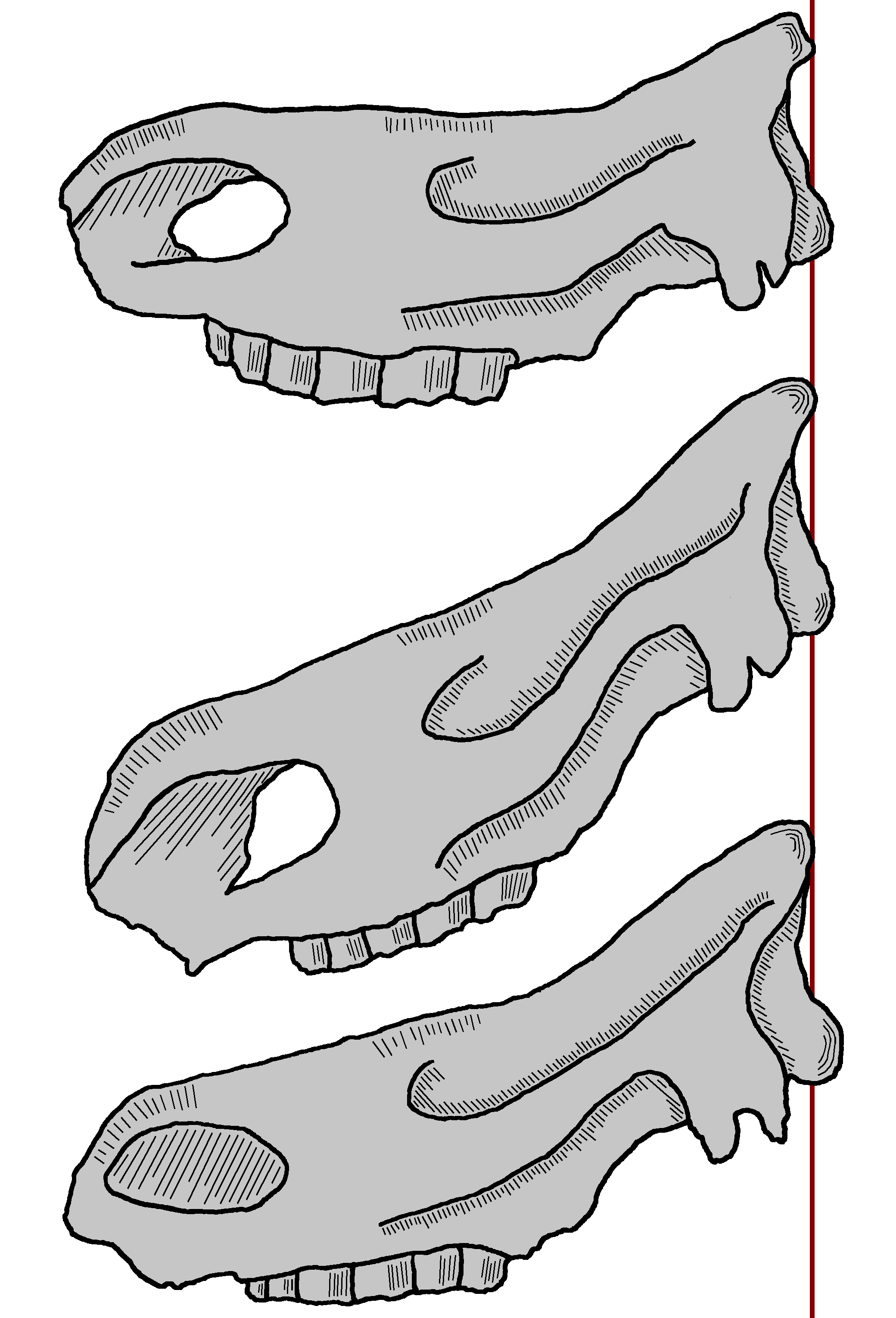
Comparison of the head angle of Merck's rhinoceros (top) with that of Stephanorhinus hemitoechus and the woolly rhinoceros (middle and bottom, respectively)

Merck's rhinoceros was a large rhinoceros, with a body mass in the range of 1,500–3,000 kilograms (3,300–6,600 lb), with a 2016 study estimating an average body weight of around 1,800–1,900 kilograms (4,000–4,200 lb). A particularly large specimen from Poland reached an estimated height at the withers of 1.82 metres (6.0 ft). It is one of the largest species of Stephanorhinus, exceeding S. hundsheimensis and S. hemitoechus in size. The bones of the skeleton are robust and massive. The skull of Merck's rhinoceros is elongated, with the septum nasalis ossified only towards its anterior (front) end. The mandibular symphysis is relatively long and the mandible has a horizontal high, thick branch.

=== Dental anatomy ===
Like other Stephanorhinus species, Merck's rhinoceros lacked incisor teeth on the upper and lower jaws, similar to living black and white rhinoceroses, with its teeth consisting of three premolars and three molars in each half of the upper and lower jaws.

The enamel of the teeth is very thick, and often bright coloured and smooth, with very thin or absent coronal cement. The buccal (cheek-facing) sides of the teeth often have sub-vertical bluish lines. Tooth dimensions are highly variable in comparison to other Stephanorhinus species. The upper teeth, especially the molars, are much higher towards the buccal side than to the lingual (towards the tongue) side. The ectolophs of the first and second upper molars have shallower folds, especially the fold between the paracone and mesostyle, than those of S. hemitoechus, resulting in a less pronounced undulation. In comparison to other species of Stephanorhinus, the premolars of S. kirchbergensis are mesially (towards the front of the tooth) broad and relatively lingually short. The upper premolar ectoloph folds are shallow, and have narrow anterior valleys. The ectoloph curves strongly mesially and often distally (towards the hind portion of the tooth) towards the inside of the tooth. In both upper molars and premolars, the metalophs and the protolophs are distinctly bulbous. The lower premolars and molars are similar and hard to distinguish.

== Taxonomy ==
The species was named by Georg Friedrich von Jäger in 1839 for Kirchberg an der Jagst in Baden-Württemberg, Germany where the type specimens of the species had been found. It is often known in English (and equivalents in other languages) as Merck's rhinoceros after Carl Heinrich Merck, who gave the initial name to the species in 1784 as Rhinoceros incisivus, that is now considered a nomen oblitum, and who after a widely used junior synonym of the species, Rhinoceros merckii (historically several alternate spellings) was named by Johann Jakob Kaup in 1841.

Merck's rhinoceros belongs to the genus Stephanorhinus, which first appeared in Europe during the Late Pliocene, around 3.5 million years ago, and is known from fossils across Eurasia. Mitochondrial and nuclear genomes obtained from Merck's rhinoceros suggest that its closest living relative is the Sumatran rhinoceros (Dicerorhinus sumatrensis), though it shares a closer common ancestry with the extinct woolly rhinoceros (Coelodonta antiquitatis), from which it suggested to have diverged around 5.5 million years ago. Genetic evidence suggests that during the Late Pleistocene Merck's rhinoceros interbred with the woolly rhinoceros, resulting in Merck's rhinoceros ancestry in some Late Pleistocene woolly rhinoceroses.

Truncated cladogram of Rhinocerotinae, showing the position of Merck's rhinoceros relative to living and Pleistocene rhinocerotine species based on morphological and genetic data, after Borrani et al. 2025.

- Rhinocerotinae
  - Dicerotini
    - White rhinoceros (Ceratotherium simum)
    - Black rhinoceros (Diceros bicornis)
  - - - Indian rhinoceros (Rhinoceros unicornis)
      - Javan rhinoceros (Rhinoceros sondaicus)
    - Dicerorhinina
      - Sumatran rhinoceros (Dicerorhinus sumatrensis)
      - - Woolly rhinoceros (Coelodonta antiquitatis)
        - Stephanorhinus
          - Stephanorhinus megarhinus
          - - Stephanorhinus jeanvireti
            - - - Stephanorhinus miguelcrusafonti
                - - Stephanorhinus etruscus
                  - Stephanorhinus hundsheimensis
              - - Narrow-nosed rhinoceros (Stephanorhinus hemitoechus)
                - Merck's rhinoceros (Stephanorhinus kirchbergensis)

== Distribution and chronology ==
=== Distribution ===
Approximate time averaged range of Stephanorhinus kirchbergensis (red) and Stephanorhinus hemitoechus (blue), with overlapping range in purple

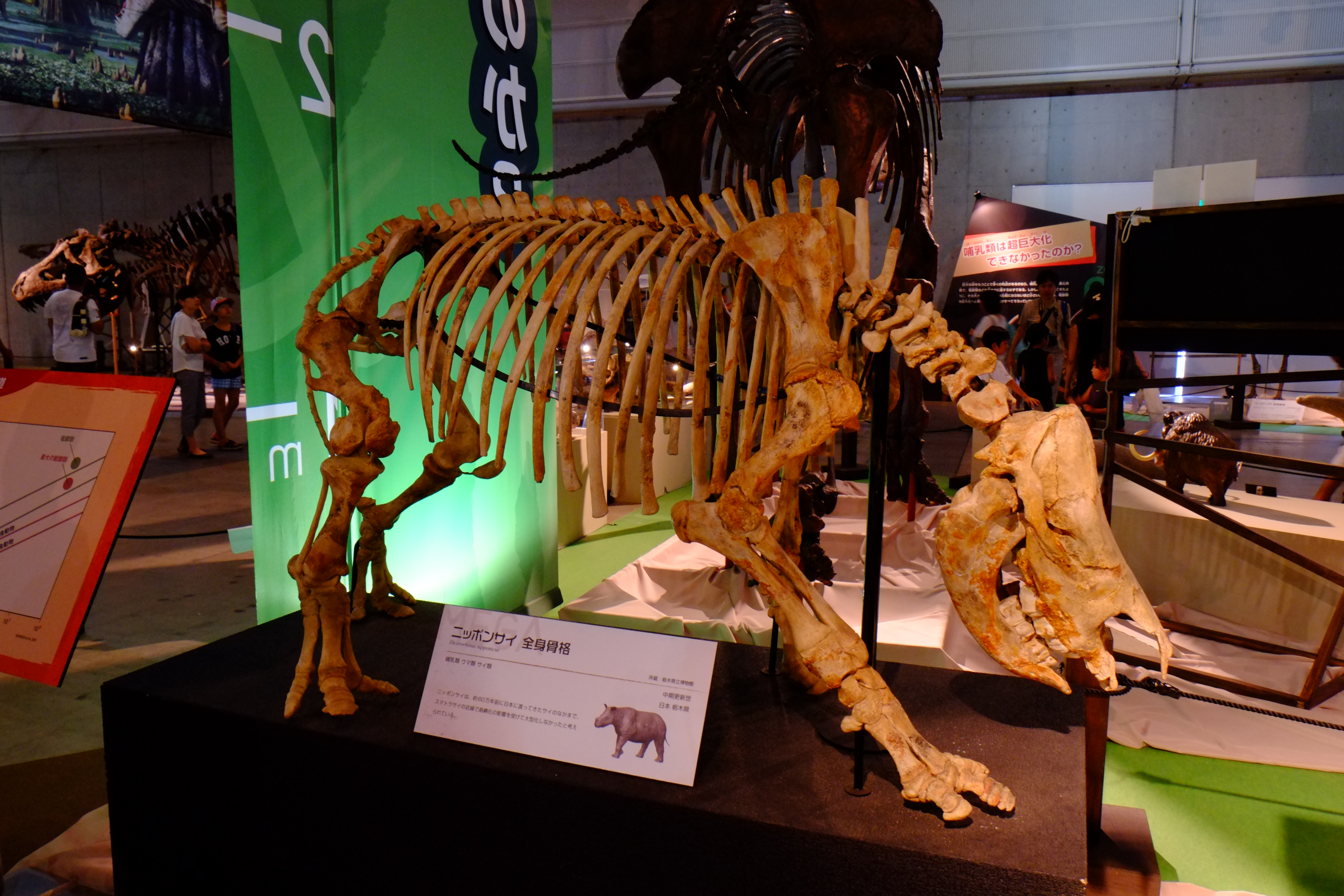
Skeleton of "Dicerorhinus nipponicus" from Japan, which is now recognised as synonym of Merck's rhinoceros (note that skull of the mount is not accurate to the real skull of S. kirchbergensis)

The distribution of Merck's rhinoceros remains spans from Western Europe to East Asia. Its range was strongly controlled by glacial cycles, with the species experiencing repeated cycles of expansion and contraction as the ice sheets advanced, this accounts for the relative rarity of its remains in comparison to the woolly rhinoceros. It was predominantly present in Europe during interglacial periods. In Europe its range extended northwards to central Poland, southern Denmark the Netherlands and southern Britain (though it appears to have been absent from Britain during the Last Interglacial), southwards to southern France, central Italy, northern Croatia, Slovenia and Romania. It appears to have been absent from the Iberian Peninsula.

Its range extended into the Arctic Circle in Eastern Siberia, with a 70–48,000 year old skull known from arctic Yakutia in the Chondon River valley (70°12′N) and a late Middle Pleistocene aged lower jaw from the Yana River valley (70°43′N), and near the Arctic Circle in European Russia, with a lower jaw known from the banks of the Kula River (a tributary of the Vashka) near Vazhgort in the Komi Republic at 64°N (which probably dates to MIS 7, c. 200,000 years ago). Teeth are known from caves in Primorsky Krai, suggested to date between 50,000 and 25,000 years ago based on dates of other bones found in the deposit, which are the easternmost known records, along with records from the Middle Pleistocene of western and central Japan (which were previously attributed to the species Dicerorhinus nipponicus).

Remains are known from the Caucasus such as from Azokh Cave in Azerbaijan. Previous claimed records from the Levant and North Africa are now thought to erroneous, and attributable to the narrow-nosed rhinoceros or other rhinoceros species. A tooth of S. cf. kirchbergensis of an unknown age is known from the Lut Desert in northeastern Iran. It is fairly common throughout the Pleistocene in North China, but is a rarer component of South Chinese assemblages, being known from around 30 localities in the region, reaching southwards to the Yangtze river.

=== Chronology ===
The earliest definitive records of the species are from Zhoukoudian Locality 13, near Beijing in northern China at around the Early-Middle Pleistocene transition approximately 800,000 years ago. Stephanorhinus yunchuchenensis from Shanxi, China, likely represents a junior synonym of S. kirchbergensis, its precise age is uncertain, but it has been suggested to date to the late Early Pleistocene. S. kirchbergensis first appeared in Europe during the early Middle Pleistocene between 700,000 and 600,000 years ago, where early on it coexisted with another Stephanorhinus species, S. hundsheimensis.

During the Last Glacial Period, the species range contracted. The timing of its extinction in Europe is uncertain, though it postdates the end of the Last Interglacial around 115,000 years ago. Radiocarbon dated remains from the Altai Mountains date to around 40,000 years ago. The youngest reliable records in China are from the Rhino Cave in Hubei, which is early Late Pleistocene in age. Though less definitive remains are known from near Harbin in Heilongjiang, which are thought to be 20,000 years in age. Records from Migong Cave just south of the Yangtze River in the Three Gorges area in northeastern Chongqing are suggested to date to MIS 2 (29,000-14,000 years ago).

== Ecology ==
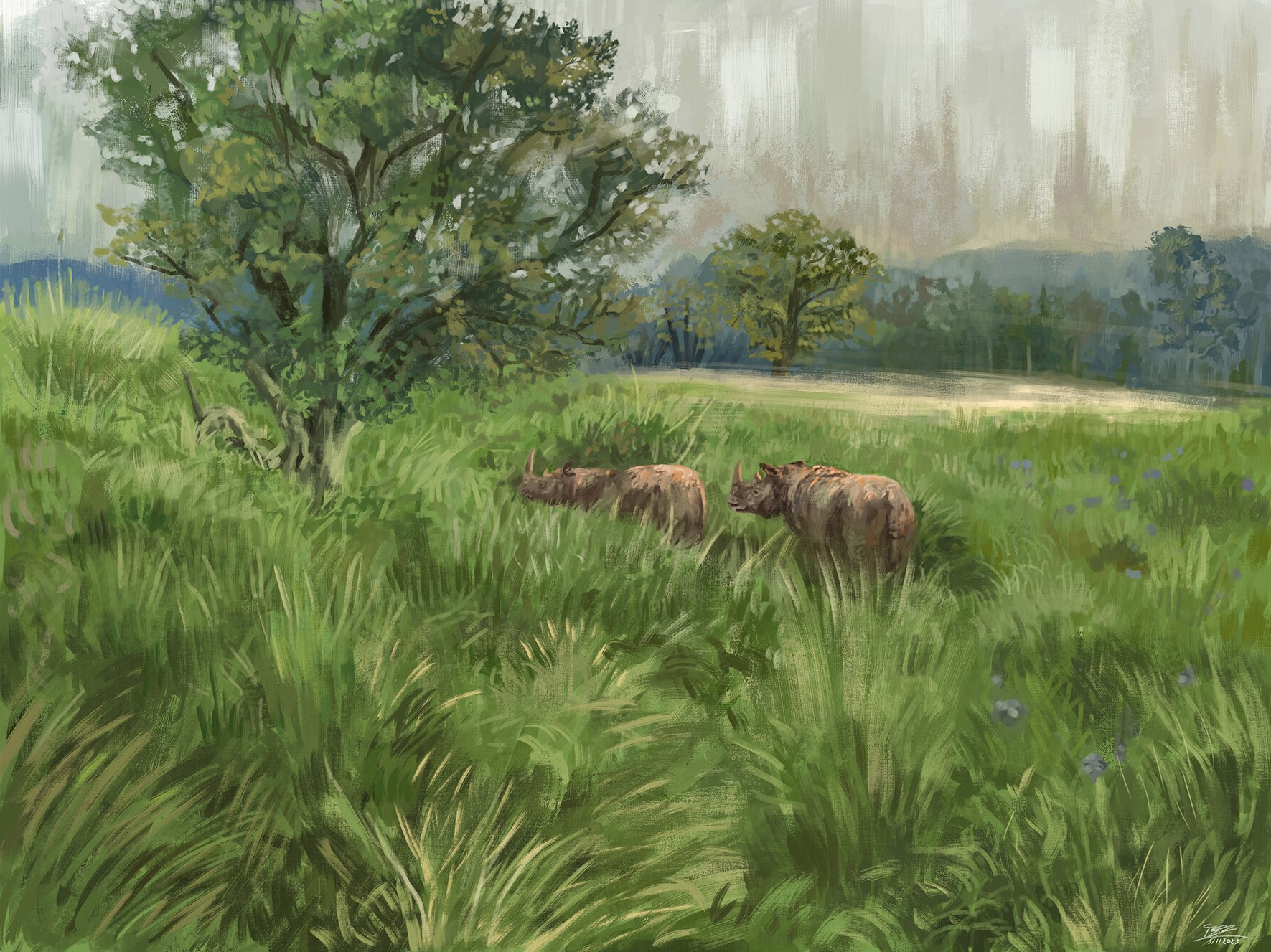
Restoration of two Merck's rhinoceros in open wooded landscape with oak trees during the Last Interglacial (130-115,000 years ago) in Europe

Although the species has been referred to as the "forest rhinoceros", the species showed broad environmental tolerances, inhabiting across its range various environments from open habitats like grassland as well as woodlands and forest. Compared to the narrow-nosed rhinoceros, S. hemitoechus, the Merck's rhinoceros did nonetheless show a preference for denser, forested habitat.

Merck's rhinoceros has been interpreted as a browser or a mixed feeder, consuming both browse such as branches and leaves of trees and shrubs, as well as low-lying vegetation. Its diet appears to have varied according to local conditions, though on average its diet included more browse than S. hemitoechus, which in Europe it often co-existed alongside.

Analysis of plant material embedded within teeth from the Neumark-Nord locality in Germany found remains of Populus (poplar or aspen) Quercus (oak), Crataegus (hawthorn), Pyracantha, Urtica (nettles) and Nymphaea (water lilies) as well as indeterminate remains of Betulaceae, Rosaceae, and Poaceae (grass). Preserved plant remains found with the teeth on the arctic Chondon skull included twigs of Salix (willow), Betula (birch) and abundant Larix (larch) alongside fragments of Ericaceae (heather); sedges were notably absent.

A specimen from Eemian aged deposits in Gorzów Wielkopolski in Poland had twigs of Corylus (hazel), Carpinus (hornbeam), and Viscum (mistletoe), alongside fruit scales of birch, with hazel and birch dominating amongst the pollen. The pollen from a specimen found at Spinadesco in Italy was dominated (~50%) by trees, particularly Alnus (alder) and Fagus (beech), with Hippophae rhamnoides (sea buckthorn), dominating amongst the shrubs, with around 30% of the total contribution being from a variety of herbaceous plants.

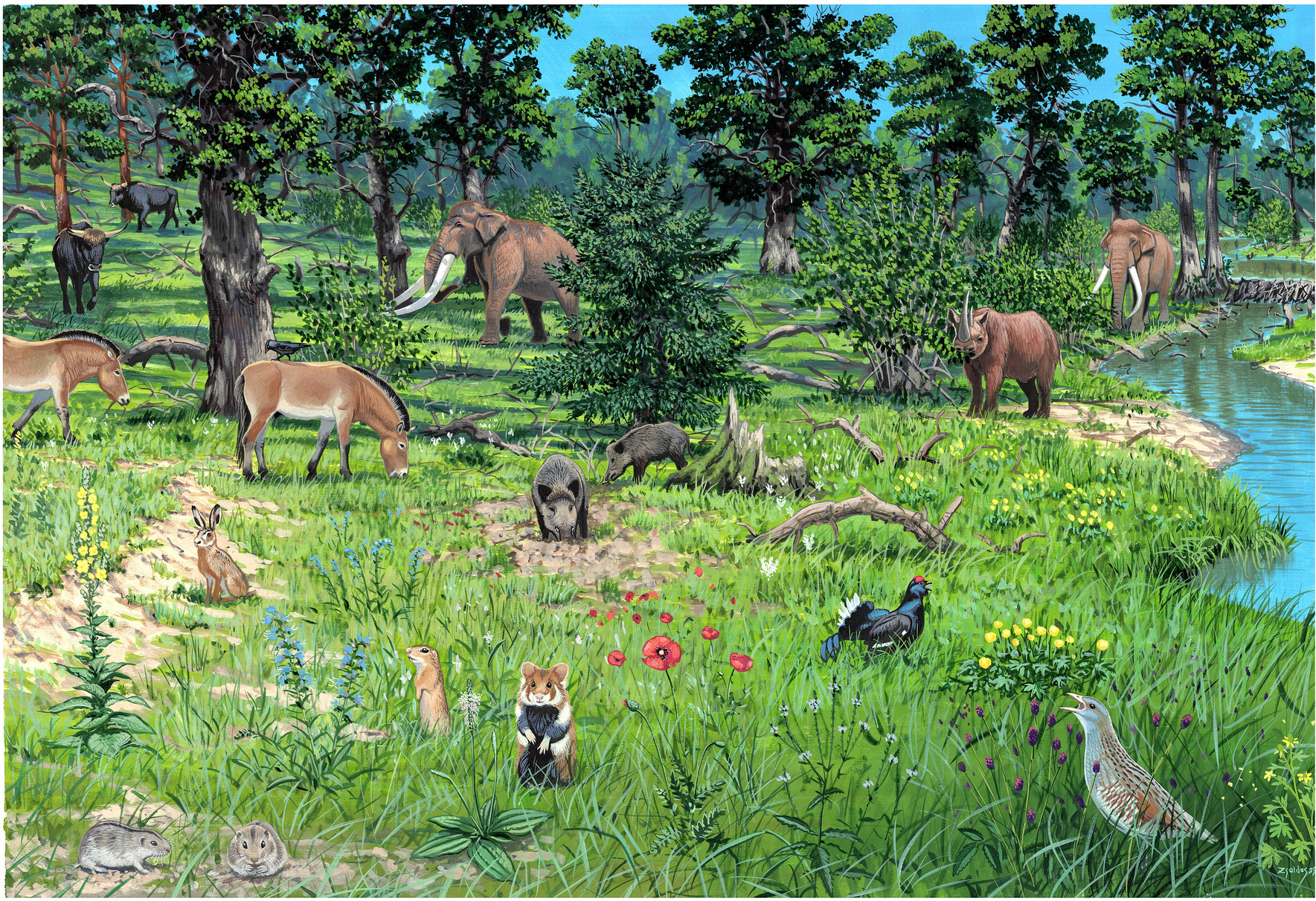
Landscape of Central Europe during the Last Interglacial (c. 130-115,000 years ago), featuring large herbivorous animals including Merck's rhinoceros, as well as straight-tusked elephant, wild boar, wild horse and aurochs. Other featured animals include western jackdaw, corn crake, black grouse, steppe lemming, the extinct ground squirrel Spermophilus citelloides, European hare and European hamster

In Europe, it formed part of the Palaeoloxodon antiquus ecological assemblage during interglacial periods, where it occurred alongside the straight-tusked elephant (Palaeoloxodon antiquus), the narrow-nosed rhinoceros (Stephanorhinus hemitoechus), aurochs (Bos primigenius), European water buffalo (Bubalus murrensis), wild horse (Equus ferus), Irish elk (Megaloceros giganteus), red deer (Cervus elaphus), fallow deer (Dama), roe deer (Capreolus capreolus), wild boar (Sus scrofa), brown bears (Ursus arctos), cave hyenas (Crocuta spelaea), cave lions (Panthera spelaea), European leopards (Panthera pardus) and wolves (Canis lupus).

In Late Pleistocene northern China, Merck's rhinoceros co-occurred alongside Chinese Palaeoloxodon elephants (of disputed classification), the woolly rhinoceros (Coelodonta antiquitatis), the buffalo Bubalus wansjocki, aurochs, the giant deer Sinomegaceros ordosianus the Asiatic wild ass (Equus hemionus), goitered gazelles (Gazella subgutturosa) the camel Camelus knoblochi, cave hyenas (Crocuta ultima), tigers (Panthera tigris), and Przewalski's horse-like horses (Equus ex gr. przewalskii).

Traumatic injuries to the jaw of an adult male S. kirchbergensis jaw from the Komi Republic may have been the result of a fight with a rival male, as is known to occur in living rhinoceroses.

== Human exploitation ==
Evidence has been found at a number of sites for the exploitation and likely hunting of Merck's rhinoceros by archaic humans. Cut marks are known on bones of S. kirchbergensis from the Guado San Nicola site in central Italy, which dates to the late Middle Pleistocene, around 400–345,000 years ago. Remains of S. kirchbergensis with cut marks have also been reported from the Medzhibozh locality in western Ukraine, dating to MIS 11, around 425–375,000 years ago.

At the collapsed cave of Payre in southeast France, dating to the late Middle Pleistocene, numerous remains of rhinoceroses, primarily S. kirchbergensis and to a lesser extent S. hemitoechus, have been found, which are suggested to have been accumulated by Neanderthals, and display marks indicative of butchery. Mortality profiles suggest that young and old individuals were preferentially targeted. The abundance of teeth found at the site (though other skull material is largely absent) suggests that the Neanderthals may have been using them as tools, particularly for lithic reduction.

At the Grays Thurrock site in southern Britain, dating to MIS 9 around 300,000 years ago, both S. kirchbergensis and S. hemitoechus are suggested to have been butchered. At the Taubach travertine site in Thuringia, Germany, which dates to the Eemian (approximately 130,000-115,000 years ago) abundant remains of Merck's rhinoceros with cut marks are known. The vast majority of remains were of young subadults, alongside a much smaller number of adults. It has been suggested that the rhinoceroses were killed and butchered on site by Neanderthals.

== Gallery ==
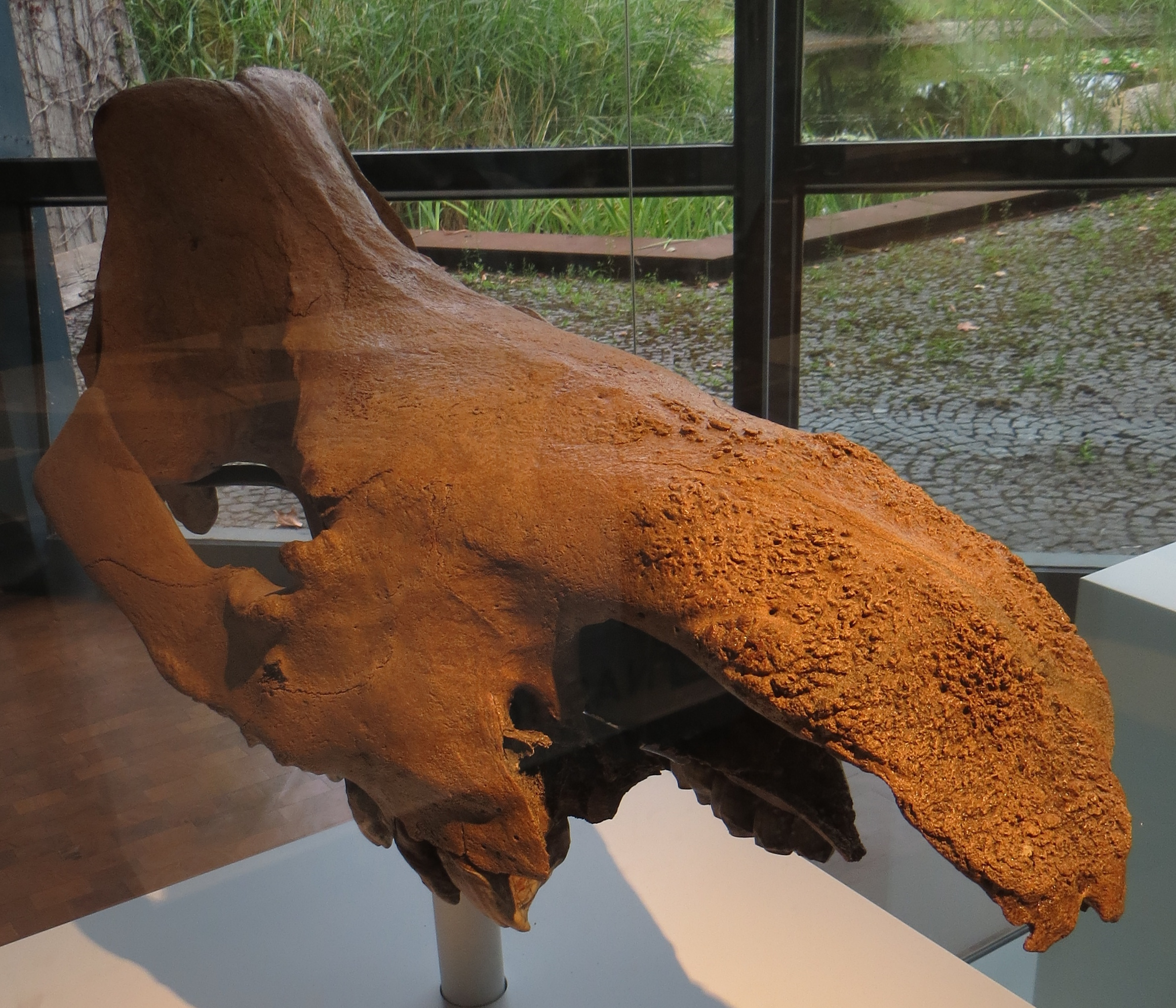
Partial skull in Stuttgart

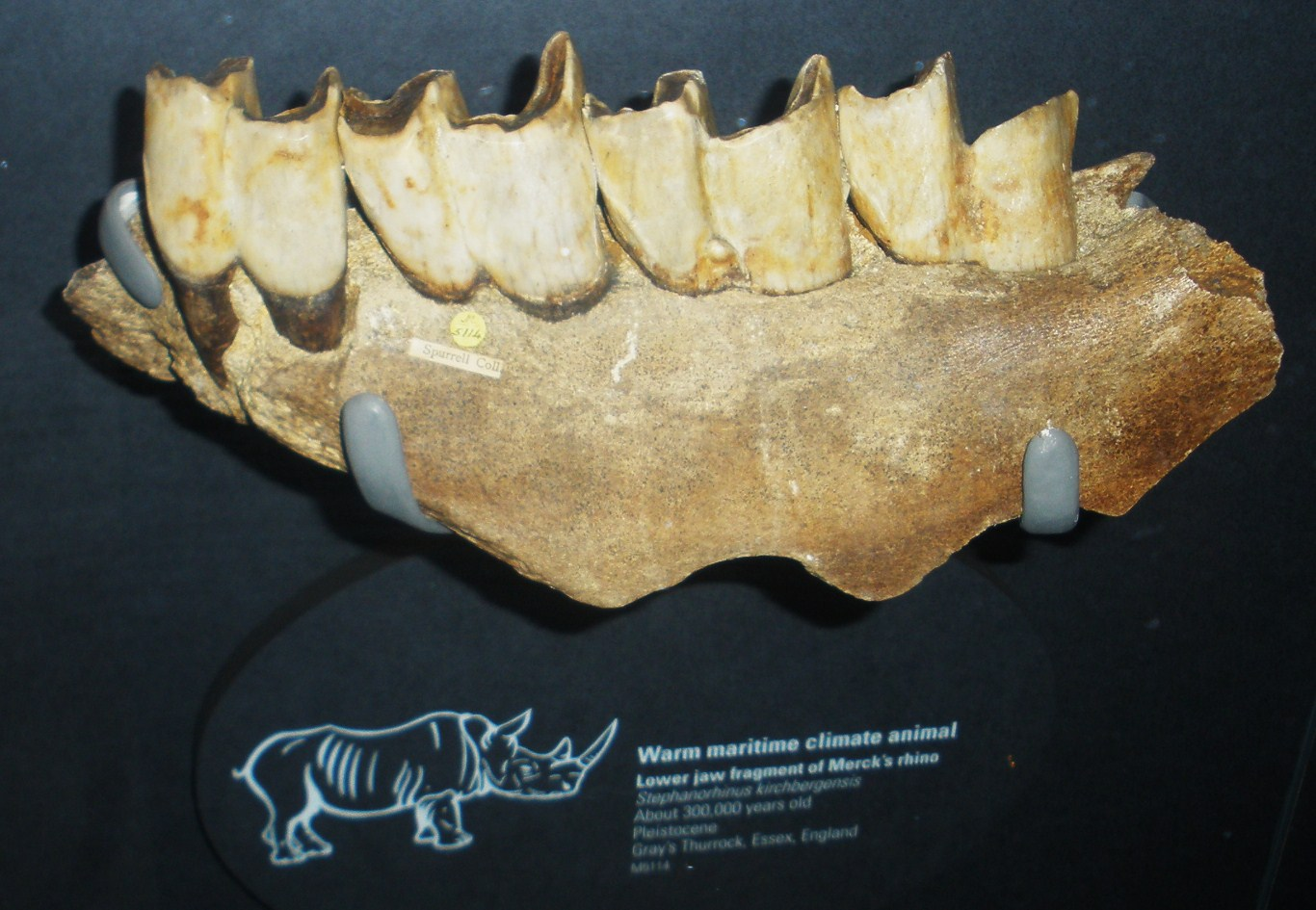
300,000 year old dentary fragment from the United Kingdom in the NHM, London

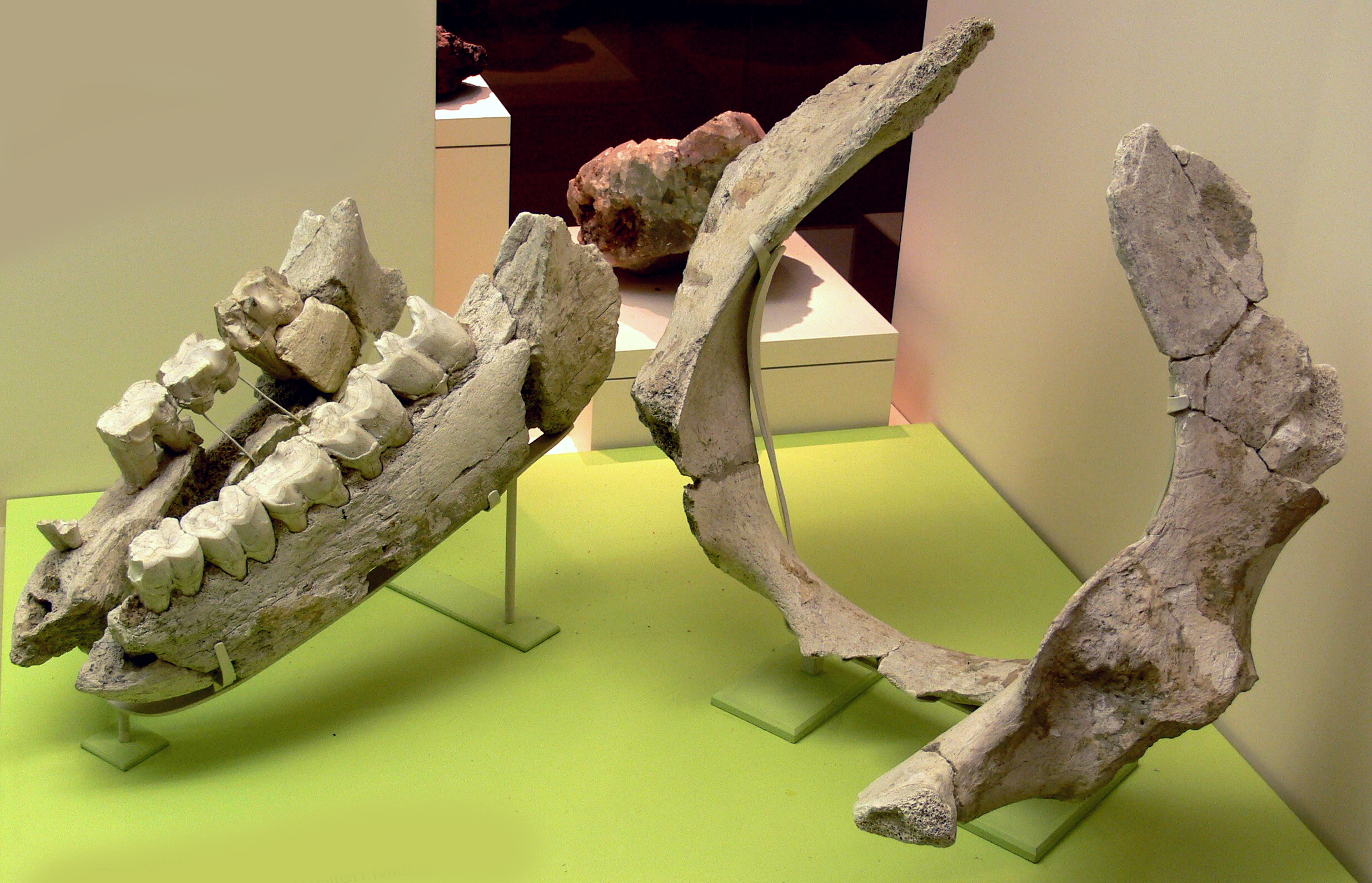
Remains of Merck's rhinoceros from Germany

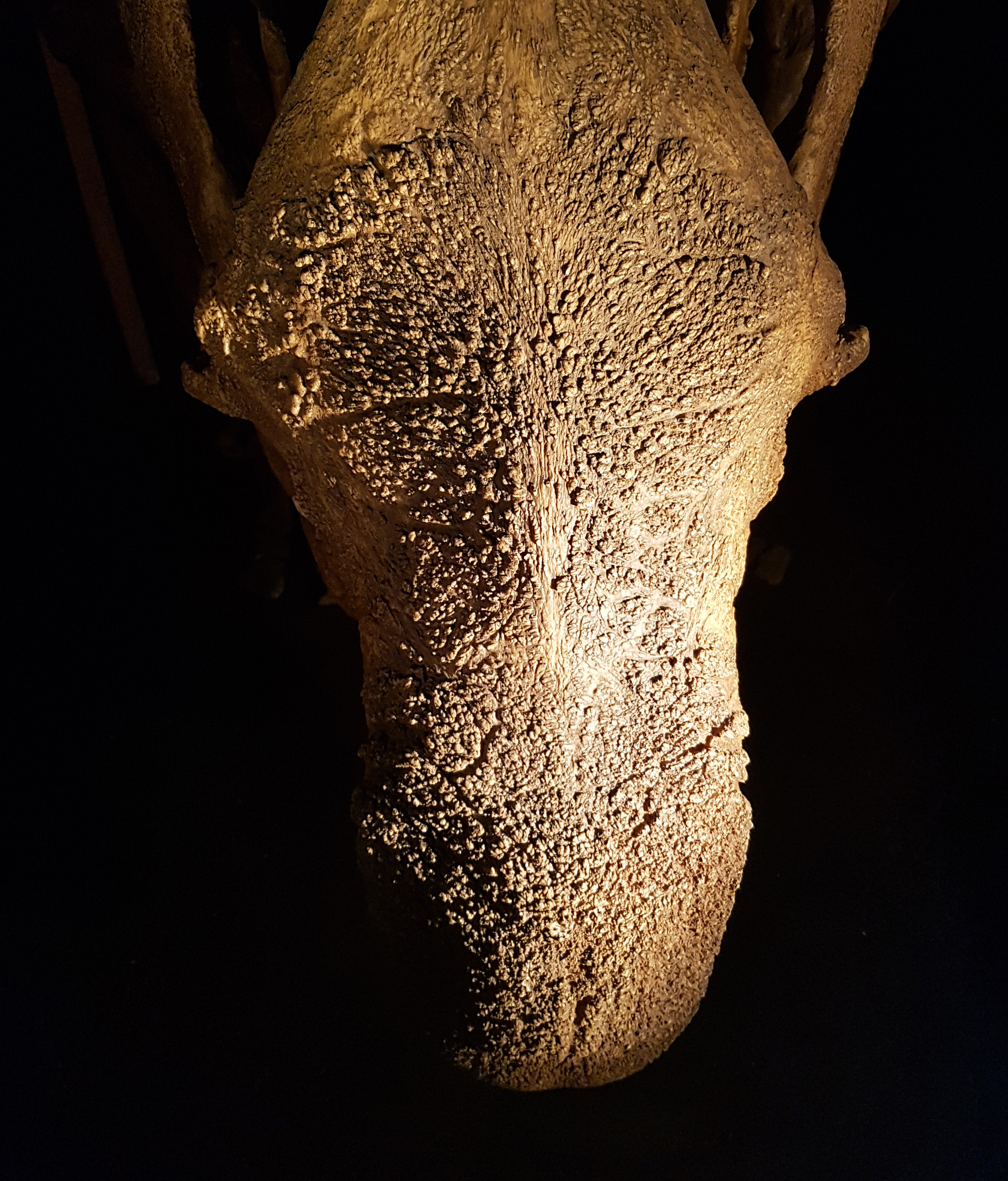
View of the top of the snout of a S. kirchbergensis skull, showing the rugose texture of the horn attachment area
