= Gaindatherium =

Gaindatherium Temporal range: Early - Mid Miocene

Scientific classification
- Kingdom: Animalia
- Phylum: Chordata
- Class: Mammalia
- Order: Perissodactyla
- Family: Rhinocerotidae
- Genus: †Gaindatherium; Colbert, 1934

Type species
- †Gaindatherium browni Colbert, 1934

Species
- G. browni; G. vidali

Extinct genus of rhinoceros

Gaindatherium is an extinct genus of rhinocerotid that lived in Asia during the Miocene. It is mainly known from the Siwalik Hills in India and Pakistan, as well as Sandhan Formation of western India, though its fossils have been discovered in Negev desert in Israel and some Miocene localities in Thailand.

== Description ==
Gaindatherium is believed to be the direct ancestor of the genus Rhinoceros. Among the features it shares with that genus are arched nasal bones that helped support its single horn and a forward-inclined back of skull. Its skull is longer and narrower compared to Rhinoceros, with more primitive brachyodont teeth.
