= Rathouisia pantherina =

Scientific classification
- Kingdom: Animalia
- Phylum: Mollusca
- Class: Gastropoda
- Order: Systellommatophora
- Family: Rathouisiidae
- Genus: Rathouisia
- Species: R. pantherina

Binomial name
- Rathouisia pantherina Heude, 1882

Synonyms
- Rathouisia tantherina (orth. error)

Species of gastropod

Rathouisia pantherina is a species of carnivorous air-breathing land slug, terrestrial pulmonate gastropod mollusc in the family Rathouisiidae.

The specific name pantherina is from Latin word "pantherinus", that means "panther-like", referring to the predatory nature of the slug.

== Taxonomy ==
Rathouisia pantherina was first described by the Jesuit zoologist and missionary to China Pierre Marie Heude in his 1882 essay series "Notes sur les Mollusques terrestres de la vallée du Fleuve Bleu". Heude noted at the time that denoting R. pantherina as a separate species was only provisional, because it may one day be reunited with congener R. tigrina. This has not yet occurred.

== Distribution ==
Rathouisia pantherina is endemic to China.

The two original Rathouisia pantherina specimens studied by Heude were found on limestone cliffs in Tchen-k'eou, now known as Chengkou, Chongqing Province, China.

== Description ==
Rathouisia pantherina is smaller than Rathouisia leonina.

Rathouisia pantherina has an elongated and ovular body. It is longer than congener R. tigrina, but shorter than congerner R. leonina. The color of its body is gray, and its epidermis is semi-transparent and reticulated. It has dorsal markings characterized by irregular polygonal patterns and shapeless spots. It does not have an internalized shell.

Rathouisia pantherina feature a buccal mass with a radula that forms a protrusible proboscis, characteristic of Rathouisiids, and lack a jaw. Rathouisiids also have a slim yet robust esophagus, with walls composed of extensively folded epithelium reinforced by connective tissue and an envelope of muscle. Their stomachs are simply a sack with merged openings for the esophagus, digestive gland, and intestine. The intestine itself follows a straight path diagonally across the body cavity, ending at the anus, which is located in their parapodial groove at the anterior right.

== Development ==
Rathouisia pantherina are externally bilaterally symmetrical with a head featuring a pair of tentacles. Characteristic of Euthyneura, their nervous systems are also mostly symmetrical, lacking the effects of torsion typical of gastropod bodies. Overall, their internal structures are still asymmetrical.

Rathouisia pantherina develop mosaically, meaning the blastomeres exhibit distinct spatial orientation. The blastomeres also display limited developmental potential, and an early determination of cell fate during embryonic development. The cell cleavage pattern is spiral and dextral.

Rathouisia pantherina are protostomes and direct developers. The developing blastula fulfills gastrulation, and becomes a prototroch larva. R. pantherina is a gastropod, so the blastula is a stereoblastula with a limited blastocoel. The veliger stage emerges as the prototroch matures into a velum. This provides mobility to the larvae. This process occurs within an egg for terrestrial slugs such as R. pantherina.

== Habitat ==
Rathouisia pantherina inhabits a subtropical monsoon humid climate. The average annual rainfall in their region is 39-55 inches. Most of this rainfall occurs between the months of May and September. The region's topography includes middle-to-low height mountains and hills. Overall, mountains account for three quarters of the ground area.

Rathouisia pantherina is inactive under natural ground litter layers in the dry season. In the rainy season, it takes advantage of the humidity and begins to move within the litter layers, resting on cool, smooth, surfaces, such as limestone. However, it does not like extremely damp conditions.

== Feeding Habits ==
Rathouisia pantherina is carnivorous, preying on snails. With the help of its protrusible proboscis, it bursts into the apertures of the snail's shell and feasts on their flesh. For more difficult or older snails, R. pantherina switches to drilling a hole into their shell and digging out the flesh. This process can take anywhere from 20 minutes to two hours, depending on the size of the victim.

Rathouisia pantherina can survive on one meal for two or three days. This is because it consumes the entire body of the snail. When an R. pantherina has moved through an area, empty snail shells will be found. The number of empty snail shells found can be used to estimate R. pantherina population numbers.

== Reproduction and Offspring ==
Rathouisia pantherina mating season is the end of April to early May. R. pantherina prepares itself for mating by eating fewer meals. In the early morning, it mates with another individual by placing its foot against the other individual's foot. Upon contact, the penuses of the individuals come out and directly penetrate the vaginas. Adhesion and penetration lasts most of the day.

Rathouisia pantherina then lays spherical or ellipsoidal eggs out in two clutches one month later. Three weeks later, the baby slugs hatch and feed on albumin secreted by microphytes and the mucus of other gastropods.
