= Rathouisia tigrina =

Scientific classification
- Kingdom: Animalia
- Phylum: Mollusca
- Class: Gastropoda
- Order: Systellommatophora
- Family: Rathouisiidae
- Genus: Rathouisia
- Species: R. tigrina

Binomial name
- Rathouisia tigrina Heude, 1882

Species of gastropod

Rathouisia tigrina is a species of carnivorous air-breathing land slug, terrestrial pulmonate gastropod mollusc in the family Rathouisiidae.

The specific name tigrina is from Latin word "tigrinus", that means "tiger-like", referring to the predatory nature of the slug.

== Distribution ==
This species occurs in China.

== Description ==
Rathouisia tigrina is smaller than Rathouisia leonina.

== Ecology ==
Rathouisia tigrina is a predatory carnivorous slug.
