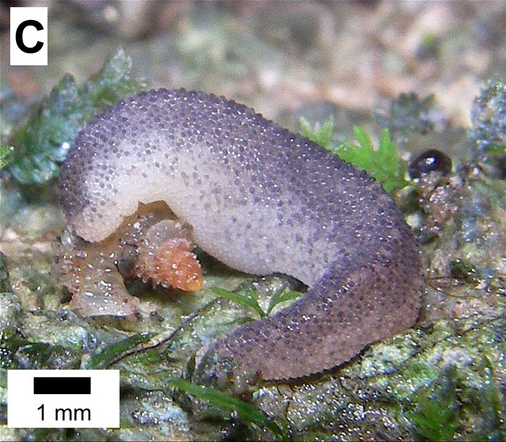
- Atopos slug attacking Plectostoma concinnum by shell-drilling.

Scientific classification
- Kingdom: Animalia
- Phylum: Mollusca
- Class: Gastropoda
- Order: Systellommatophora
- Family: Rathouisiidae
- Genus: Atopos; Simroth, 1891

Diversity
- 10 species

= Atopos =

Genus of gastropods

Atopos is a genus of carnivorous air-breathing land slugs, terrestrial pulmonate gastropod mollusks in the family Rathouisiidae.

== Species ==
Species within the genus Atopos include:

- Atopos aborense (Ghosh, 1913)
- Atopos australis Heynemann, 1876
- Atopos cristagalli P. Sarasin & F. Sarasin, 1899
- Atopos galeatus Simroth, 1920
- Atopos harmeri Collinge, 1902
- Atopos kempii Ghose, 1913
- Atopos leuckarti Simroth, 1891
- Atopos laidlawi Collinge, 1902
- Atopos maximus Collinge 1903
- Atopos ouwensi Collinge, 1908
- Atopos prismatica Tapparone-Canefri, 1883
- Atopos pristis P. Sarasin & F. Sarasin, 1899
- Atopos punctata Collinge, 1902
- Atopos rugosus Collinge, 1902
- Atopos sanguinolentus Ghosh, 1912
- Atopos sarasini Collinge 1902
- Atopos schildii Babor, 1900
- Atopos scutulatus P. Sarasin & F. Sarasin, 1899
- Atopos semperi Simroth, 1891
- Atopos simrothi P. Sarasin & F. Sarasin, 1899
- Atopos smithi (Collinge, 1902)
- Atopos strubelli Simroth, 1891
- Atopos tourannensis (Eydoux & Souleyet, 1852)

Synonyms:

- Atopos leonina (Heude, 1882) is a synonym of Rathouisia leonina Heude, 1882

== Distribution ==
The predatory carnivorous slugs in the genus Atopos are found in peninsular Malaysia, Sumatra, Borneo, New Guinea, northeast Australia and, recently, Singapore.

== Feeding habits ==
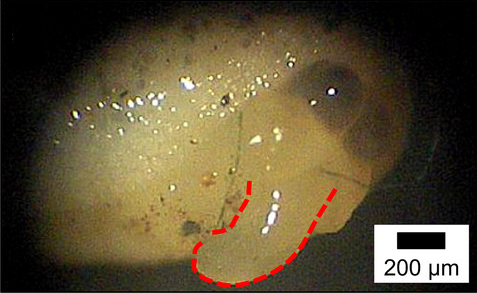
Atopos sp. slug proboscis (marked with red outline) (the proboscis was not fully extended).

Bornean Atopos specialising in Opisthostoma are known to tailor their approach to the size of the prey. They hold small snails with the shells aperture-upward with the front of its foot and eat their way down. Larger ones scrape away the shell to allow access through the spire. This behaviour is thought to drive the evolution of shell ornamentation in Opisthostoma.
