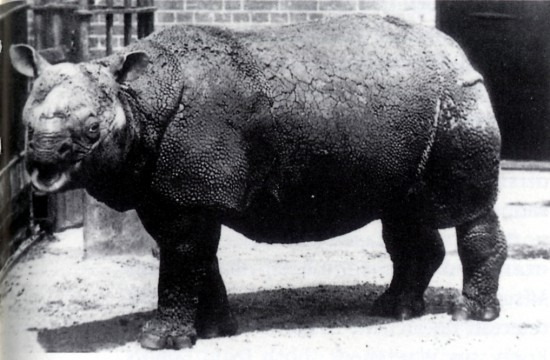
- Javan rhinoceros in the London Zoo

Conservation status
- Critically Endangered (IUCN 3.1)
- CITES Appendix I

Scientific classification
- Kingdom: Animalia
- Phylum: Chordata
- Class: Mammalia
- Order: Perissodactyla
- Family: Rhinocerotidae
- Genus: Rhinoceros
- Species: R. sondaicus

Binomial name
- Rhinoceros sondaicus Desmarest, 1822

Subspecies
- Rhinoceros sondaicus sondaicus; Rhinoceros sondaicus annamiticus†; Rhinoceros sondaicus inermis †
- Javan rhinoceros range

= Javan rhinoceros =

Javan rhinoceros Temporal range: Late Pliocene–recent

Rare species of rhinoceros from Asia

The Javan rhinoceros (Rhinoceros sondaicus), also called Javan rhino, Sunda rhinoceros and lesser one-horned rhinoceros is a critically endangered member of the genus Rhinoceros of the family Rhinocerotidae, and one of the five remaining extant rhinoceros species. It has a plate-like skin with protective folds and is one of the smallest rhinoceros species with a body length of 3.1–3.2 m (10.2–10.5 ft) and a 1.4–1.7 m (4.6–5.6 ft) long tail. The heaviest specimens weigh around 2,300 kg (5,100 lb). Its horn is usually shorter than 25 cm (9.8 in).

Until the mid-19th to about the early 20th century, the Javan rhinoceros had ranged beyond the islands of Java and Sumatra and onto the mainland of Southeast Asia and Indochina, northwest into East India, Bhutan, and the south of China. Today, it is the rarest of all rhinoceroses, and among the rarest of all living animal species, with only one currently known wild population, and no individuals successfully kept in captivity. It is among the rarest large mammals in the world with a population around 74 within Ujung Kulon National Park, at the far western tip of Java, Indonesia.

The decline of the Javan rhinoceros is primarily attributed to poaching for the males' horns, which are highly valued in traditional Chinese medicine, fetching as much as US$30,000 per kg on the black market. As the presence of colonial Dutch and other Europeans in its range increased, peaking in the 1700–1800s, trophy hunting also became a serious threat. Loss of habitat and massive human population growth especially postwar times have also contributed to its decline and hindered the species' recovery. The remaining range is within one nationally protected area, and Ujung Kulon is also a UNESCO World Heritage Site. Nonetheless, rural, potentially rugged park boundaries mean that law enforcement cannot be equally present in all places at all times; in some areas, this lack of security still places the species at risk from poachers, disease exposure, and ultimately loss of genetic diversity, leading to genetic "bottlenecking" (i.e., inbreeding depression).

The Javan rhinoceros can live around 30–45 years in the wild. It historically inhabited dense lowland rainforest, wet grasslands, and vast floodplains at forest edges. It is mostly solitary, except for courtship and rearing offspring, though groups may occasionally congregate near wallows and salt licks. Aside from humans, whom they usually avoid, adults have no natural predators in their range. Very small juveniles may be preyed upon, if left unsupervised, typically by Javan leopards, the now extinct Javan tiger, or rarely saltwater crocodiles. Scientists and conservationists rarely study the animals directly due to their extreme rarity and the danger of interfering with such an endangered species. Researchers instead rely on camera traps and fecal samples to gauge health and behavior. Consequently, Javan rhinos are the least-studied of all rhinoceros species. Two adult female Javan rhinoceroses, each with a calf, were filmed using a motion-triggered trail camera, the video being released on 28 February 2011 by WWF and Indonesia's National Park Authority, proving they are still breeding in the wild.

== Etymology ==
The generic name Rhinoceros is a combination of the ancient Greek words ῥίς (ris) meaning nose and κέρας (keras) meaning horn of an animal. The specific name sondaicus is derived from sunda, the biogeographical region that comprises the islands of Sumatra, Java, Borneo, and surrounding smaller islands. The Javan rhino is also known as the lesser one-horned rhinoceros (in contrast with the greater one-horned rhinoceros, another name for the Indian rhino).

== Taxonomy ==
Rhinoceros sondaicus was the scientific name used by Anselme Gaëtan Desmarest in 1822 for a rhinoceros from Java sent by Pierre-Médard Diard and Alfred Duvaucel to the National Museum of Natural History, France. In the 19th century, several zoological specimens of hornless rhinoceroses were described:

- Rhinoceros inermis proposed by René Lesson in 1838 was a female rhinoceros without horns shot in the Sundarbans.
- Rhinoceros nasalis and Rhinoceros floweri proposed by John Edward Gray in 1867 were two rhinoceros skulls from Borneo and one from Sumatra, respectively.
- Rhinoceros annamiticus proposed by Pierre Marie Heude in 1892 was a specimen from Vietnam.

As of 2005, three Javan rhinoceros subspecies are considered valid taxa:

- R. s. sondaicus, the nominate subspecies, known as the Indonesian Javan rhinoceros
- R. s. inermis, known as the Indian Javan rhinoceros or lesser Indian rhinoceros
- R. s. annamiticus, known as the Vietnamese Javan rhinoceros or Vietnamese rhinoceros

=== Evolution ===
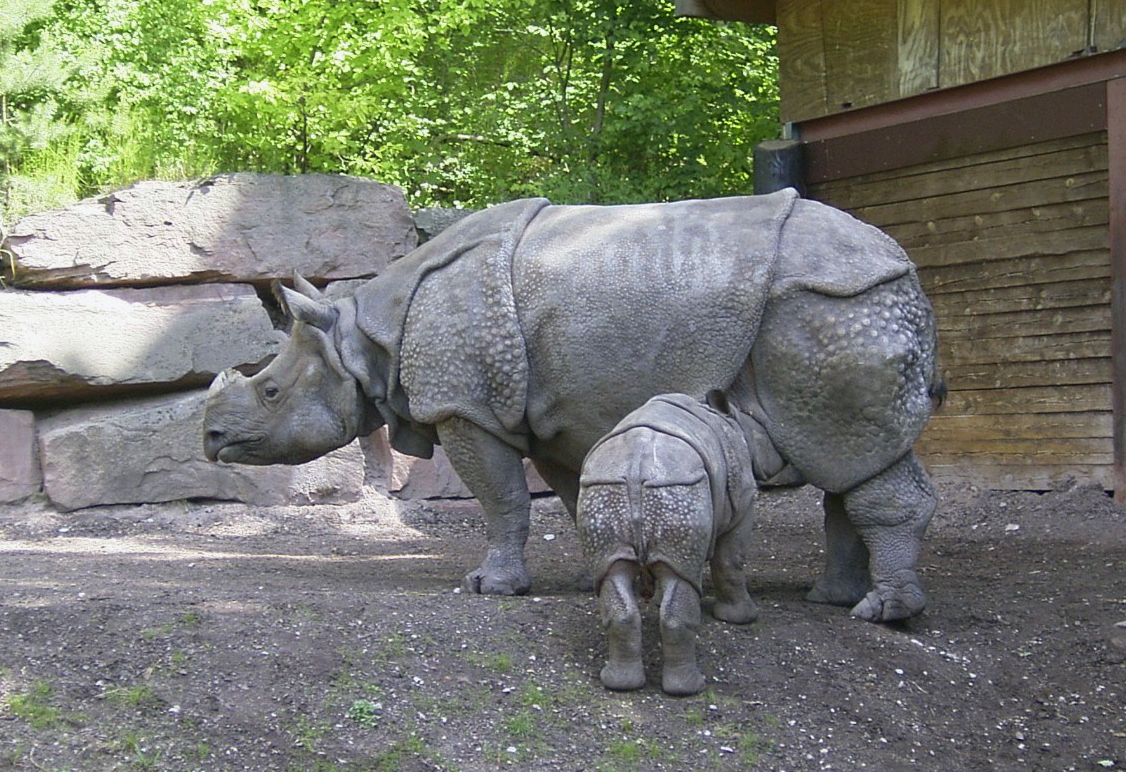
The Indian rhinoceros pictured here is the species most closely related to the Javan rhinoceros; they are the two members of the type genus Rhinoceros.

Ancestral rhinoceroses are held to have first diverged from other perissodactyls in the Early Eocene. Mitochondrial DNA comparison suggests the ancestors of modern rhinos split from the ancestors of the Equidae around 50 million years ago (Mya). The extant family, the Rhinocerotidae, first appeared in the Late Eocene in Eurasia, and the ancestors of the extant rhino species dispersed from Asia beginning in the Miocene.

The last common ancestor of living rhinoceroses belonging to the subfamily Rhinocerotinae is suggested to have lived around 16 Mya, with the ancestors of the genus Rhinoceros diverging from the ancestors of other living rhinoceroses around 15 Mya. The genus Rhinoceros has been found to be overall slightly more closely related to the Sumatran rhinoceros (as well as to the extinct woolly rhinoceros and the extinct Eurasian genus Stephanorhinus) than to living African rhinoceroses, though gene flow appears to have occurred between the ancestors of living African rhinoceroses and the genus Rhinoceros, as well as between the ancestors of the genus Rhinoceros and the ancestors of the woolly rhinoceros and Stephanorhinus.

A cladogram showing the relationships of recent and Late Pleistocene rhinoceros species (minus Stephanorhinus hemitoechus) based on whole nuclear genomes

- - Elasmotheriinae
    †Elasmotherium sibiricum
  - Rhinocerotinae
    - - White Rhinoceros (Ceratotherium simum)
      - Black rhinoceros (Diceros bicornis)
    - - - - † Woolly rhinoceros (Coelodonta antiquitatis)
          - † Merck's rhinoceros (Stephanorhinus kirchbergensis)
        - Sumatran rhinoceros (Dicerorhinus sumatrensis)
      - - Javan rhinoceros (Rhinoceros sondaicus)
        - Indian rhinoceros (Rhinoceros unicornis)

The oldest known definitive fossils of the Javan rhinoceros are from the Late Pliocene deposits of Myanmar, Java, and Pakistan. Molecular estimates suggest the Indian and Javan rhinoceros diverged from each other earlier, around 4.3 million years ago. An astragalus fossil similar to that of the Javan rhinoceros from the Late Miocene deposits of Myanmar have been identified as Rhinoceros cf. R. sondaicus.

== Description ==
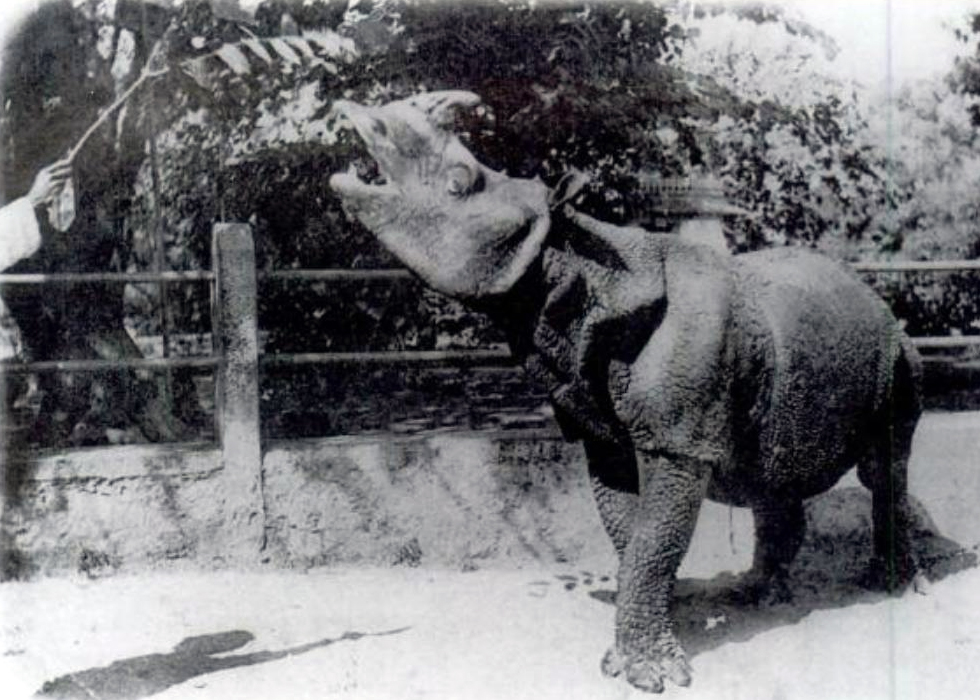
Captive Javan rhino, around 1900

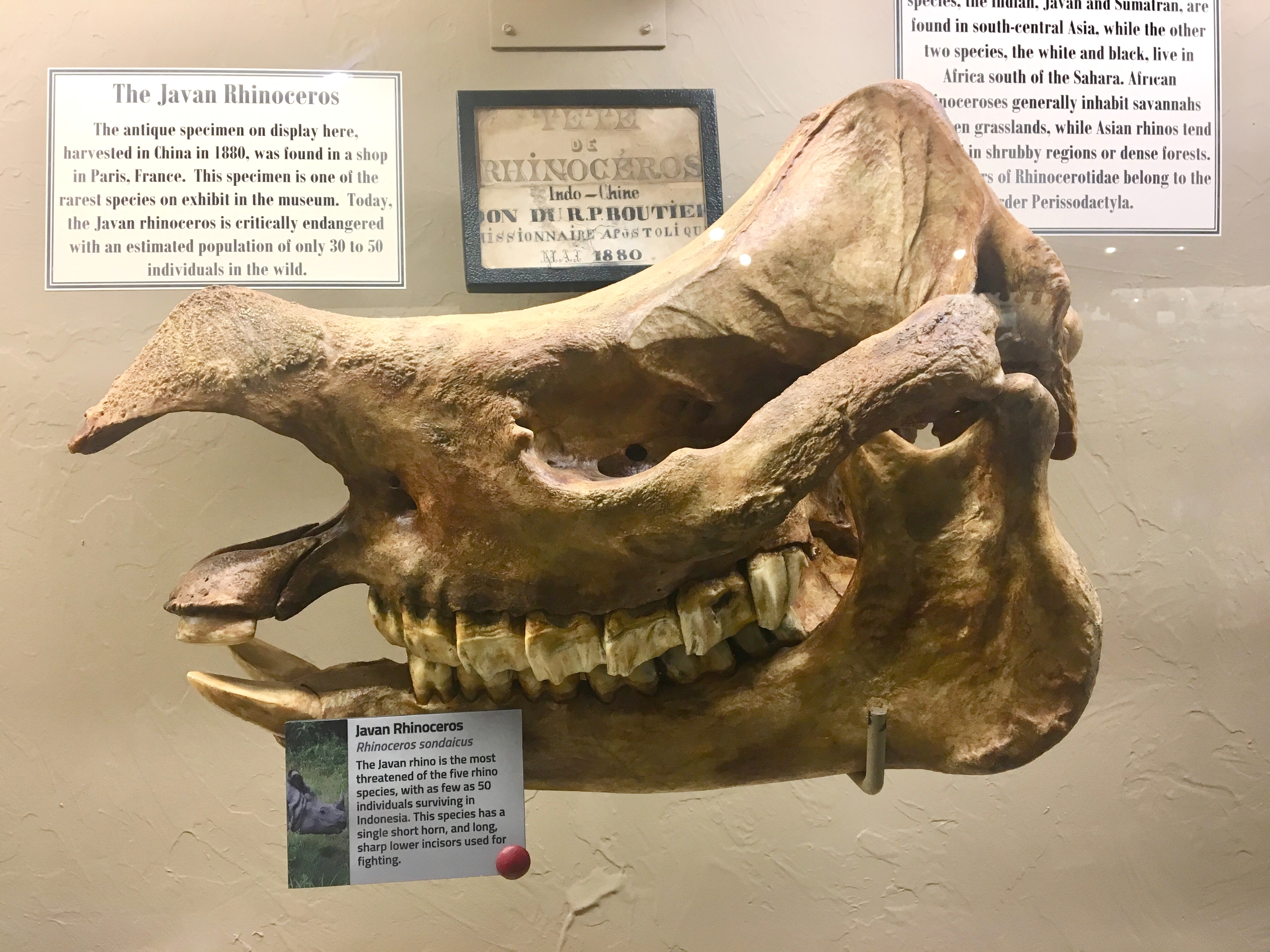
Javan rhinoceros skull

Javan rhinos are smaller than the Indian rhinoceros, and are close in size to the black rhinoceros. They are the largest animal in Java and the second-largest animal in Indonesia after the Asian elephant. The length of a Javan rhino including its head is 2 to 4 m (6.6 to 13.1 ft), and it can reach a height of 1.4–1.7 m (4.6–5.6 ft). Adults are variously reported to weigh between 900 and 2,300 kg (2,000 and 5,100 lb), although a study to collect accurate measurements of the animals has never been conducted and is not a priority because of their extreme conservation status. No substantial size difference is seen between genders, but cows may be slightly bigger. The rhinos in Vietnam appeared to be significantly smaller than those in Java, based on studies of photographic evidence and measurements of their footprints.

Like the Indian rhino, the Javan rhino has a single horn (the other extant species have two horns). Its horn is the smallest of all extant rhinos, usually less than 20 cm (7.9 in) with the longest recorded only 27 cm (11 in). Only bulls have horns. Cows are the only extant rhinos that remain hornless into adulthood, though they may develop a tiny bump of an inch or two in height. Javan rhinos do not appear to often use their horns for fighting, but instead use them to scrape mud away in wallows, to pull down plants for eating, and to open paths through thick vegetation. Similar to the other browsing species of rhino (black and Sumatran), the Javan rhino has a long, pointed, upper lip, which helps in grabbing food. The lower incisors are long and sharp; when Javan rhinos fight, they use these teeth. Behind the incisors, two rows of six low-crowned molars are used for chewing coarse plants. Like all rhinos, Javan rhinos smell and hear well, but have very poor vision. They are estimated to live for 30 to 45 years.

Their hairless, splotchy gray, or gray-brown skin falls in folds to the shoulder, back, and rump. The skin has a natural mosaic pattern, which lends the rhino an armored appearance. The neck folds of Javan rhinoceros are smaller than those of the Indian rhinoceros, but still form a saddle shape over the shoulders. Because of the risks of interfering with such an endangered species, however, Javan rhinos are primarily studied through fecal sampling and camera traps. They are rarely encountered, observed, or measured directly.

== Distribution and habitat ==
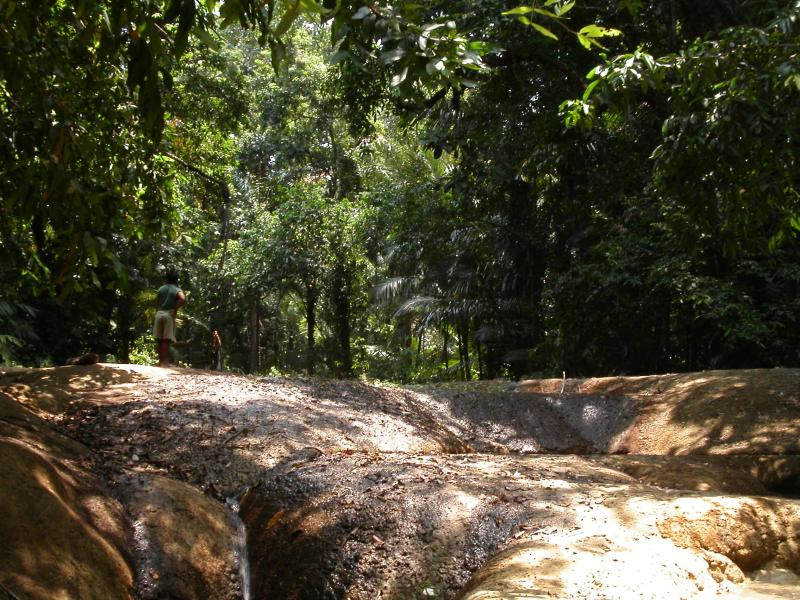
Java's Ujung Kulon National Park is the home of all remaining Javan rhinos.

Fossil remains of Javan rhinoceros have been found at the Neolithic site of Hemudu in Zhejiang, China, and the 4th century BCE Classic of Mountains and Seas appears to describe one living in the Yangtze River basin. Remains were also found in the Tam Hay Marklot cave site in northeastern Laos that date to the Pleistocene.

Historically, Javan rhinoceroses were widespread from Assam and Bengal, eastward to Myanmar, Thailand, Cambodia, Laos, Vietnam, and southwards to the Malay Peninsula and the islands of Sumatra, Java, and Borneo. Today, the species only occurs in Ujung Kulon National Park in southwestern Java, where fewer than 100 individuals are estimated to survive.

The range of the Javan rhinoceros has been shrinking for at least 3,000 years. Starting around 1000 BC, the northern range of the rhinoceros extended into China, but began moving southward at roughly 0.5 km (0.31 mi) per year, as human settlements increased in the region. It likely became locally extinct in India in the first decade of the 20th century. The Javan rhino was hunted to extinction on the Malay Peninsula by 1932. The last ones on Sumatra are thought to have died during World War II; it may have also been present on Borneo, but these specimens could have been Sumatran rhinocerosses, a small population which still lives there.

The Javan rhinoceros was sighted in the Sunderbans between 1630 and 1908, but only six were thought to have survived by 1892.

By the end of the Vietnam War, the Vietnamese rhinoceros was thought extinct across all of mainland Asia. Local hunters and woodcutters in Cambodia claim to have seen Javan rhinos in the Cardamom Mountains, but surveys of the area have failed to find any evidence. In the late 1980s, a small population was found in the Cat Tien area of Vietnam, but the last known individual of that population was shot in 2010. The population in Vietnam's Cat Tien National Park was declared locally extinct in 2011.

The Javan rhinoceros primarily inhabits dense, lowland rain forests, grasslands, and reed beds with abundant rivers, large floodplains, or wet areas with many mud wallows. Although it historically preferred low-lying areas, the subspecies in Vietnam was pushed onto much higher ground (up to 2,000 m or 6,561 ft), probably because of human encroachment and poaching.

== Behavior and ecology ==
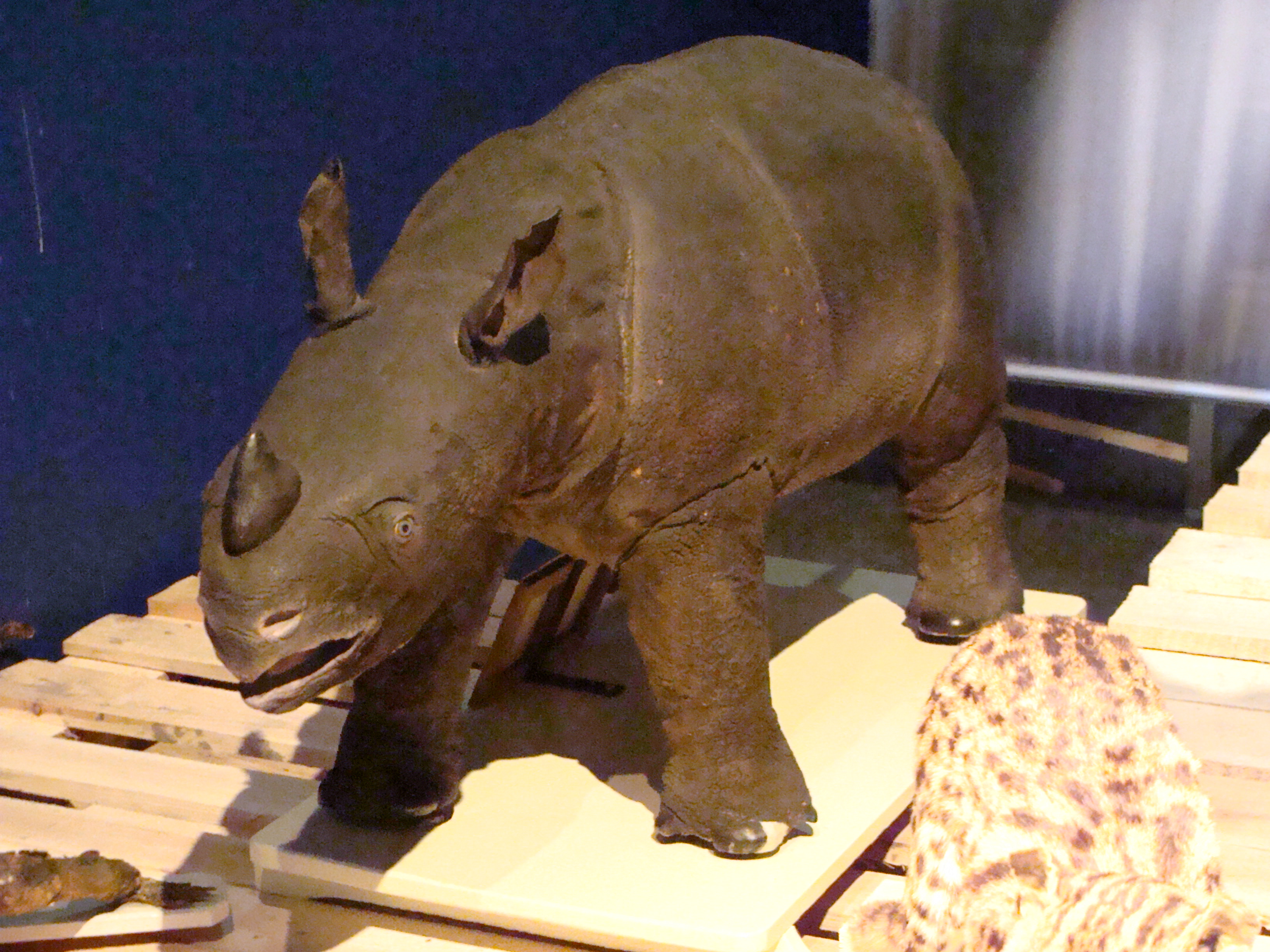
A museum specimen of a juvenile Javan rhinoceros

The Javan rhinoceros is a solitary animal with the exception of breeding pairs and mothers with calves. They sometimes congregate in small groups at salt licks and mud wallows. Wallowing in mud is a common behavior for all rhinos; the activity allows them to maintain cool body temperatures and helps prevent disease and parasite infestation. The Javan rhinoceros does not generally dig its own mud wallows, preferring to use other animals' wallows or naturally occurring pits, which it uses its horn to enlarge. Salt licks are also very important because of the essential nutrients the rhino receives from the salt. Bull home ranges are larger at 12–20 km^{2} (4.6–7.7 sq mi) compared to the cow, which are around 3–14 km^{2} (1.2–5.4 sq mi). Bull territories overlap each other less than those of the cow. Whether territorial fights occur is unknown.

Bulls mark their territories with dung piles and by urine spraying. Scrapes made by the feet in the ground and twisted saplings also seem to be used for communication. Members of other rhino species have a peculiar habit of defecating in massive rhino dung piles and then scraping their back feet in the dung. The Sumatran and Javan rhinos, while defecating in piles, do not engage in the scraping. This adaptation in behavior is thought to be ecological; in the wet forests of Java and Sumatra, the method may not be useful for spreading odors. The Javan rhino is much less vocal than the Sumatran; very few Javan rhino vocalizations have ever been recorded. Adults have no known predators other than humans. The species, particularly in Vietnam, is skittish and retreats into dense forests whenever humans are near. Though a valuable trait from a survival standpoint, it has made the rhinos difficult to study. Nevertheless, when humans approach too closely, the Javan rhino becomes aggressive and will attack, stabbing with the incisors of its lower jaw while thrusting upward with its head. Its comparatively antisocial behavior may be a recent adaptation to population stresses; historical evidence suggests they, like other rhinos, were once more gregarious.

=== Diet ===
The Javan rhinoceros is herbivorous, eating diverse plant species, especially shoots, twigs, young foliage, and fallen fruit. Most of the plants favored by the species grow in sunny areas in forest clearings, shrubland, and other vegetation types with no large trees. The rhino knocks down saplings to reach its food and grabs it with its prehensile upper lip. It is the most adaptable feeder of all the rhino species. Currently, it is a pure browser, but probably once both browsed and grazed in its historical range. The rhino eats an estimated 50 kg (110 lb) of food daily. Like the Sumatran rhino, it needs salt in its diet. The salt licks common in its historical range do not exist in Ujung Kulon, but the rhinos there have been observed drinking seawater, likely for the same nutritional need.

== Conservation ==
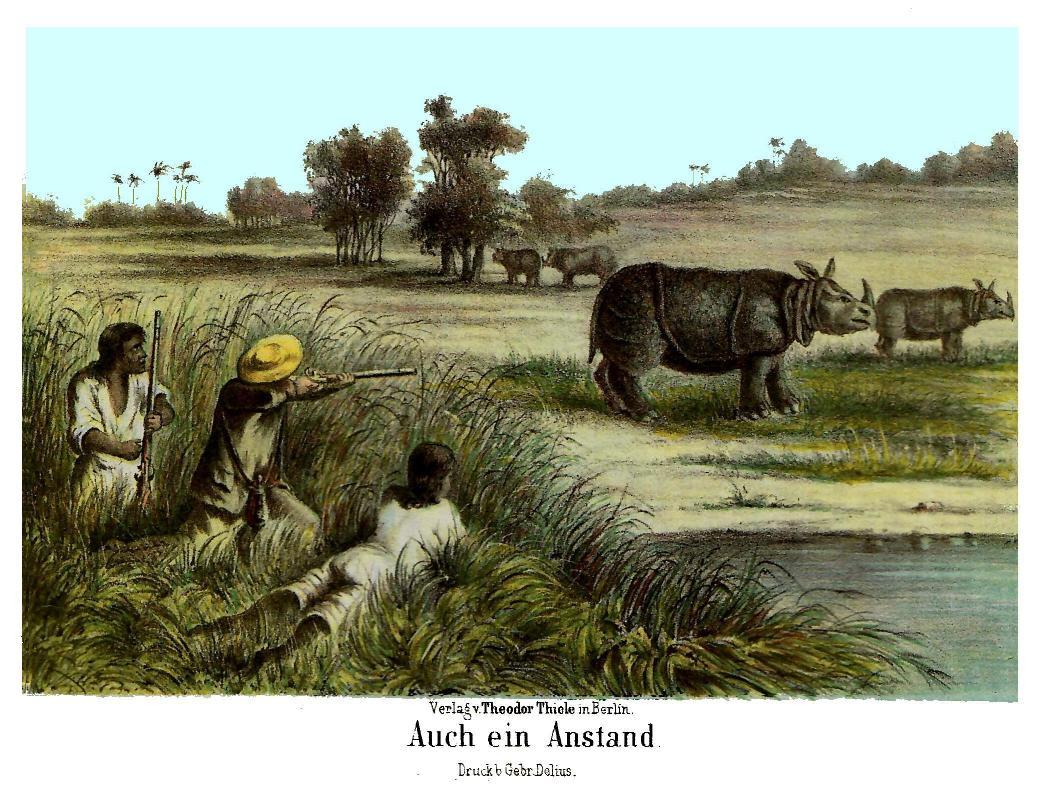
A painting from 1861 depicts the hunting of a Javan rhinoceros

The main factor in the continued decline of the Javan rhinoceros population has been poaching for horns, a problem that affects all rhino species. The horns have been a traded commodity for more than 2,000 years in China, where they are believed to have healing properties. Historically, the rhinoceros' hide was used to make armor for Chinese soldiers, and some local tribes in Vietnam believed the hide could be used to make an antidote for snake venom. Because the rhinoceros' range encompasses many areas of poverty, convincing local people not to kill a seemingly (otherwise) useless animal which could be sold for a large sum of money has been difficult. When the Convention on International Trade in Endangered Species of Wild Fauna and Flora first went into effect in 1975, the Javan rhinoceros was listed under Appendix I, meaning commercial international trade in the Javan rhinoceros and products derived from it is prohibited. Surveys of the rhinoceros horn black market have determined that Asian rhinoceros horn fetches a price as high as $30,000 per kg, three times the value of African rhinoceros horn.

Loss of habitat because of agriculture has also contributed to its decline, though this is no longer as significant a factor because the rhinoceros only lives in one nationally protected park. Deteriorating habitats have hindered the recovery of rhino populations that fell victim to poaching. Even with all the conservation efforts, the prospects for their survival are grim. Because the population is restricted to one small area, they are very susceptible to disease and inbreeding depression. Conservation geneticists estimate a population of 100 rhinos would be needed to preserve the genetic diversity of this conservation-reliant species.

=== Ujung Kulon ===
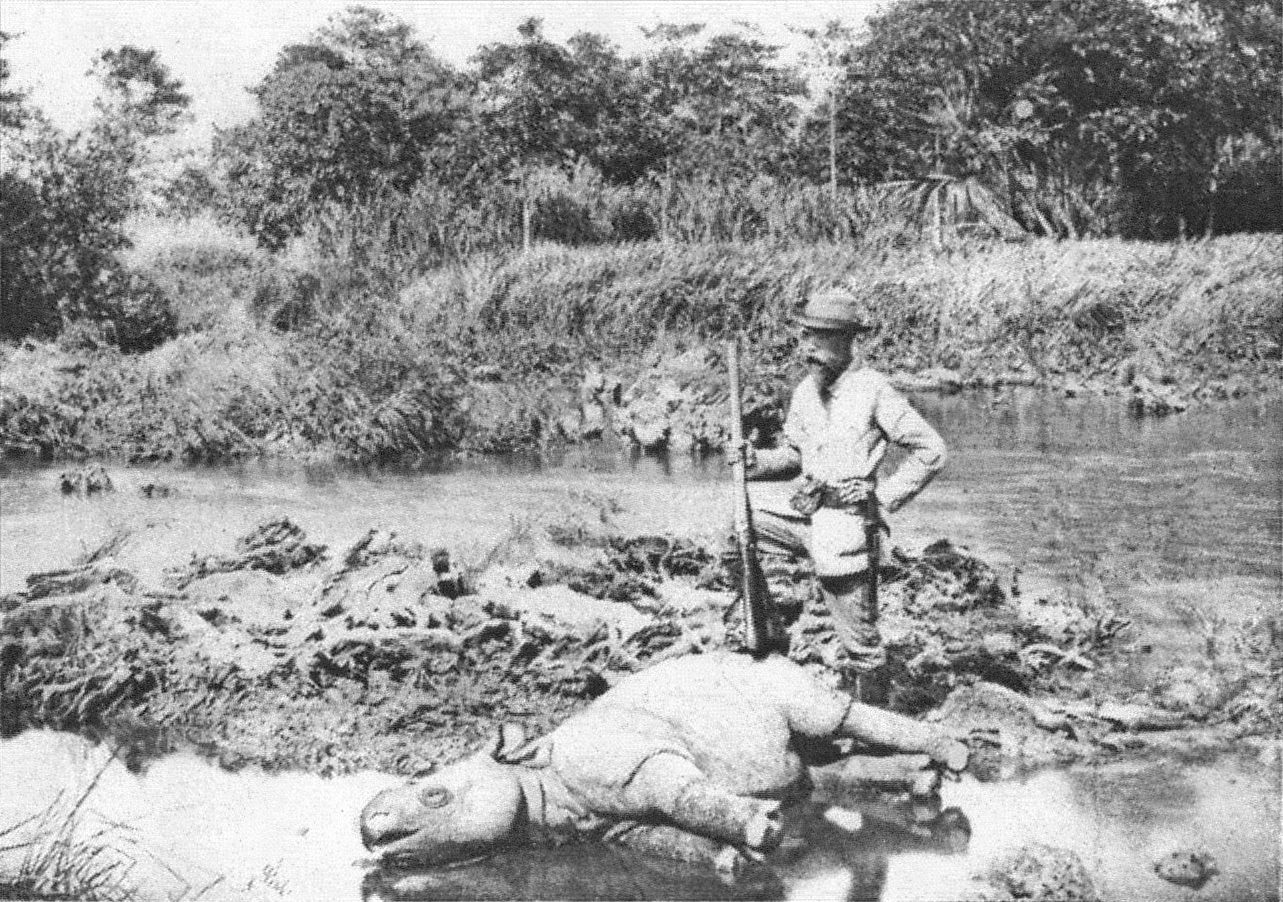
A Dutch hunter with a dead Javan rhinoceros in Ujung Kulon, 1895

The Ujung Kulon peninsula of Java was devastated by the eruption of Krakatoa in 1883. The Javan rhinoceros recolonized the peninsula after the event, but humans never returned in large numbers, thus creating a haven for wildlife. In 1931, as the Javan rhinoceros was on the brink of extinction in Sumatra, the government of the Dutch East Indies declared the rhino a legally protected species, which it has remained ever since. A census of the rhinos in Ujung Kulon was first conducted in 1967; only 25 animals were recorded. By 1980, that population had doubled and has remained steady, at about 50, ever since. Although the rhinos in Ujung Kulon have no natural predators, they have to compete for scarce resources with wild cattle, which may keep their numbers below the peninsula's carrying capacity. Ujung Kulon is managed by the Indonesian Ministry of Forestry. Evidence of at least four baby rhinos was discovered in 2006, the most ever documented for the species.

In March 2011, a hidden-camera video was published showing adults and juveniles, indicating recent matings and breeding. During the period from January to October 2011, the cameras had captured images of 35 rhinos. As of December 2011, a rhino-breeding sanctuary in an area of 38,000 hectares is being finalized to help reach the target of 70 to 80 Javan rhinos by 2015.

In April 2012, the WWF and International Rhino Foundation added 120 video cameras to the existing 40 to better monitor rhino movements and judge the size of the animals' population. A recent survey has found far fewer cows than bulls. Only four cows among 17 rhinos were recorded in the eastern half of Ujung Kulon, which is a potential setback in efforts to save the species.

In 2012, the Asian Rhino Project was working out the best eradication programme for the arenga palm, which was blanketing the park and crowding out the rhinos' food sources. Following the trails of Javan rhinoceros allowed in-depth observation of their feeding habits in their natural habitat. Comparing the acid insoluble ash (MA) content of faeces and in the dry weight of food provided reliable estimates of digestibility, and this method has potential for wider application in situations where total collection of faecal matter is not feasible. A strong positive correlation was shown between the size of home range and diversity of food intake, and between the size of home range with the numbers of wallow holes used. The quantity and quality of food intake were variable among rhinoceroses and over time. Overall energy consumption was related to the size of the animal, while the digestibility of plants consumed appeared to be influenced by individual age and habitat conditions.

In May 2017, Director of the Biodiversity Conservation at the Ministry of Environment and Forestry, Bambang Dahono Adji announced plans to transfer the rhinos to the Cikepuh Wildlife Sanctuary located in West Java. The animals will first undergo DNA tests to determine lineage and risk to disease so as to avoid issues such as inbreeding or marriage kinship. As of December 2018, these plans had yet to happen.

In December 2018, the remaining Javan rhino population was severely endangered by the tsunami triggered by nearby volcano Anak Krakatau.

In 2024, officials announced that recently arrested poachers confessed to killing a total of 26 Javan rhinos, potentially cutting the total population by one-third. At least four Javan rhinoceros calves have been recorded between August 2023 and 2024; one seen in May 2024 was estimated to have been three to five months old.

In 2026, proposals to establish a second habitat for the Javan rhino drew renewed debate due to vulnerable condition of javan rhino population in Ujung Kulon National Park to disease, inbreeding and natural disasters. In November 2026, Hashim Djojohadikusumo told a COP31 media briefing that a tsunami triggered by an earthquake or an eruption of Anak Krakatau could wipe out the species, and Alas Purwo National Park in East Java entered public discussion as a possible destination for relocation. The Ministry of Forestry said in the same month that there no official decision to relocate rhinos to Alas Purwo had been made, and lawmakers and researchers urged caution. A researcher at the National Research and Innovation Agency (BRIN) noted that Alas Purwo was not among the four sites assessed in earlier studies in 2009 and 2015, so those findings cannot be used to judge its suitability. Commentators and environmental groups questioned whether a move would save the species or add risk, and WALHI and Greenpeace suspected a link to extractive industries, pointing to a February 2026 ministerial decree that placed waters around Ujung Kulon within a mining business area (Wilayah Usaha Pertambangan). Reports noted that such a designation is not itself a mining permit and that the national park's land area lies outside it.

=== Cat Tien ===
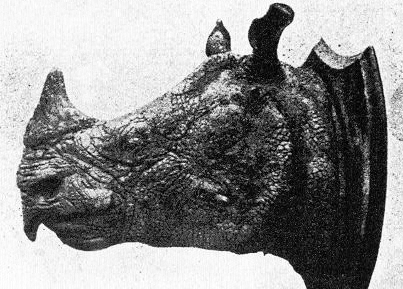
Head of a male R. s. annamiticus shot in Perak on the Malay Peninsula

Once widespread in Southeast Asia, the Javan rhinoceros was presumed extinct in Vietnam in the mid-1970s, at the end of the Vietnam War. The combat wrought havoc on the ecosystems of the region through the use of napalm, extensive defoliation from Agent Orange, aerial bombing, use of landmines, and overhunting by local poachers.

In 1988, the assumption of the subspecies' extinction was challenged when a hunter shot an adult cow, proving the species had somehow survived the war. In 1989, scientists surveyed Vietnam's southern forests to search for evidence of other survivors. Fresh tracks belonging to up to 15 rhinos were found along the Dong Nai River. Largely because of the rhinoceros, the region they inhabited became part of the Cat Tien National Park in 1992.

By the early 2000s, their population was feared to have declined past the point of recovery in Vietnam, with some conservationists estimating as few as three to eight rhinos, and possibly no bulls, survived. Conservationists debated whether or not the Vietnamese rhinoceros had any chance of survival, with some arguing that rhinos from Indonesia should be introduced in an attempt to save the population, with others arguing that the population could recover.

Genetic analysis of dung samples collected in Cat Tien National Park in a survey from October 2009 to March 2010 showed only a single individual Javan rhinoceros remained in the park. In early May 2010, the body of a Javan rhino was found in the park. The animal had been shot and its horn removed by poachers. In October 2011, the International Rhino Foundation confirmed the Javan rhinoceros was extinct in Vietnam, leaving only the rhinos in Ujung Kulon.

=== In captivity ===
A Javan rhinoceros has not been exhibited in a zoo for over a century. In the 19th century, at least four rhinos were exhibited in Adelaide, Calcutta, and London. At least 22 Javan rhinos have been documented as having been kept in captivity; the true number is possibly greater, as the species was sometimes confused with the Indian rhinoceros.

The Javan rhinoceros never fared well in captivity. The oldest lived to be 20, about half the age that the rhinos can reach in the wild. No records are known of a captive rhino giving birth. The last captive Javan rhino died at the Adelaide Zoo in Australia in 1907, where the species was so little known that it had been exhibited as an Indian rhinoceros.

In 2025, a male rhinoceros named Mustofa was successfully relocated from the wild to the Javan Rhino Study and Conservation Area inside Ujung Kulon National Park. Mustofa died two days after arrival. A team of pathologists from IPB university later determined multiple causes of death, associated with underlying chronic diseases.

== In culture ==
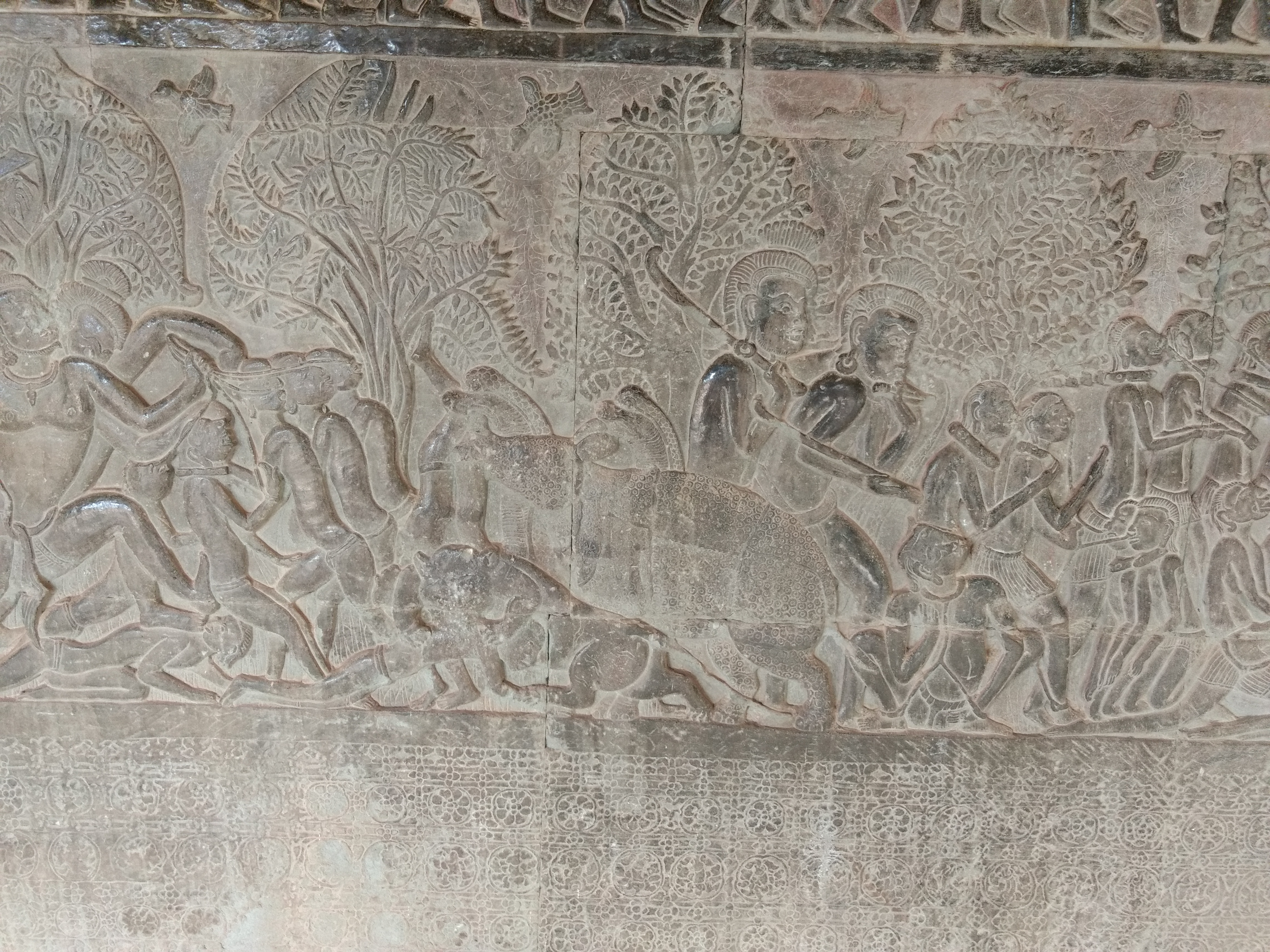
Rhino tormenting the damned in the "heaven and hell" gallery at Angkor Wat (12th century)

The Javan rhinoceros occurred in Cambodia in the past and at least three depictions of rhinos are in the bas reliefs of the temple at Angkor Wat. The west wing of the North Gallery has a relief that shows a rhino mounted by a god thought to be the fire god Agni. The rhinos are thought to be Javan rhinoceros rather than the somewhat similar-looking one-horned Indian rhino on the basis of the skinfold on the shoulder that continues along the back in the Javan to give a saddle-like appearance. A depiction of the rhino in the east wing of the South Gallery shows a rhino attacking the damned in the panel depicting heaven and hell. An architect of the temple is thought to have been an Indian Brahmin priest named Divakarapandita (1040–1120 AD) who served king Jayavarman VI, Dharanindravarman I, as well as Suryavarman II, who constructed the temple. The Indian priest who died before the construction of the temple is thought to have influenced the use of tubercles on the skin, which are based on the Indian rhino, while the local Khmer artisans carved the other details of the rhinos based on the more familiar local Javan rhino. The association of the rhinoceros as the vahana of the god Agni is unique to Khmer culture. Another rhinoceros carving in the middle of a circular arrangement in a column with other circles containing elephants and water buffalo is known from the temple of Ta Prohm. Based on anachronistic speculation, it might represent a stegosaur due to the leaves behind it that give the impression of plates.

The mascot of the 2023 FIFA U-20 World Cup is a Javan rhinoceros named Bacuya.
