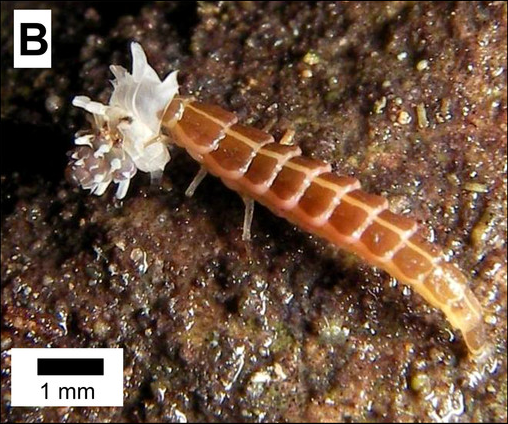
- Pteroptyx tener larva attacking Opisthostoma fraternum

Scientific classification
- Kingdom: Animalia
- Phylum: Mollusca
- Class: Gastropoda
- Subclass: Caenogastropoda
- Order: Architaenioglossa
- Family: Diplommatinidae
- Genus: Opisthostoma; Blanford & Blanford, 1860

= Opisthostoma =

Genus of gastropods

Opisthostoma is a genus of minute land snails with opercula, terrestrial gastropod mollusks or micromollusks in the family Diplommatinidae.

== Species ==
Species in the genus Opisthostoma include:

Opisthostoma sensu stricto

- Opisthostoma beeartee
- Opisthostoma bihamulatum
- Opisthostoma decrespignyi
- Opisthostoma dormani
- Opisthostoma fraternum
- Opisthostoma inornatum
- Opisthostoma jucundum
- Opisthostoma nilgiricum Blanford & Blanford 1860 - type species
- Opisthostoma otostoma
- Opisthostoma perspectivum
- Opisthostoma simplex
- Opisthostoma vermiculum

Synonyms

Plectostoma was treated as a subgenus of Opisthostoma. In a 2014 revision, Plectostoma is treated as a separate genus.

- Opisthostoma everetti
- Opisthostoma goniostoma
- Opisthostoma grandispinosum
- Opisthostoma hosei
- Opisthostoma mirabile
- Opisthostoma obliquedentatum Vermeulen, 1994 is a synonym of Plectostoma obliquedentatum (Vermeulen, 1994)
- Opisthostoma pulchellum
- Opisthostoma lituus
- Opisthostoma shelfordi
- Opisthostoma stellasubis
