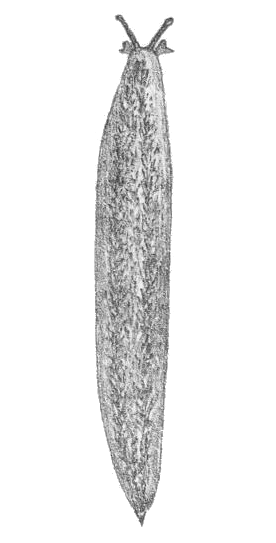
- Drawing of Rathouisia leonina (dorsal aspect) by Charles Rathouis

Scientific classification
- Domain: Eukaryota
- Kingdom: Animalia
- Phylum: Mollusca
- Class: Gastropoda
- Order: Systellommatophora
- Family: Rathouisiidae
- Genus: Rathouisia
- Species: R. leonina

Binomial name
- Rathouisia leonina Heude, 1882

Synonyms
- Vaginulus sinensis Heude, 1882

= Rathouisia leonina =

Species of gastropod

Rathouisia leonina is a species of carnivorous air-breathing land slug, a terrestrial pulmonate gastropod mollusc in the family Rathouisiidae. This species is endemic to China.

This slug is carnivorous and actively preys on snails. It is usually grayish brown to dark gray in color with scattered black spots on the upper surface of the body. The bottom surface of the foot is a light reddish brown. These slugs inhabit environments with high humidity and shade, such as foothills and city gardens, although they are rarely seen.

== Taxonomy ==
Rathouisia leonina was first described by the French missionary and zoologist Pierre Marie Heude in 1882. It is the type species of the genus Rathouisia, which was named in honor of the Jesuit Père Charles Rathouis who made the original drawings of the specimens for Heude.

The specific name leonina is from Latin word "leo", which means lion, referring to the predatory nature of the slug.

== Distribution ==
Rathouisia leonina is endemic to China. It is found in the following areas:

- Eastern China: the foothills of the Purple Mountain, Nanjing in Jiangsu province
- Central China: Yichang in Hubei province
- Southern China: Shaoguan in Guangdong province
- Southwest China: Chengkou County in Sichuan province, along the Yangtze River

== Description ==
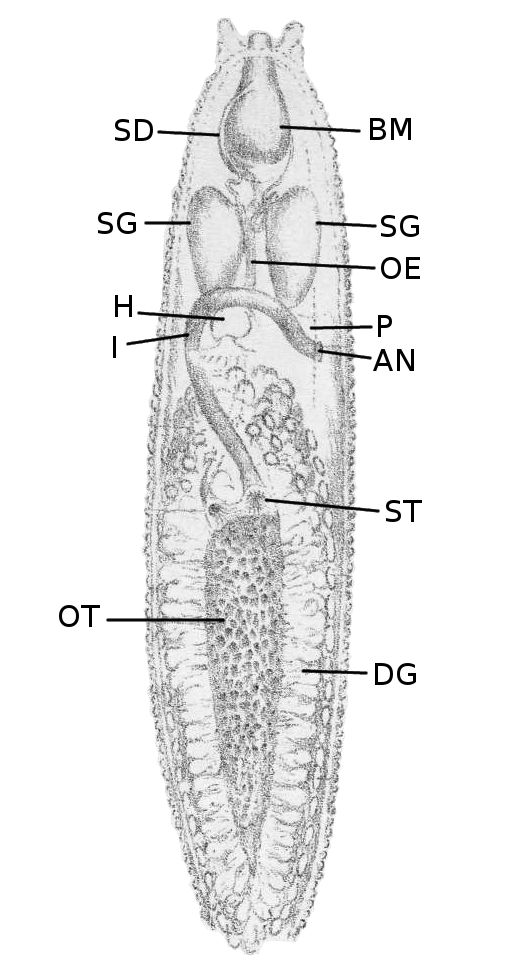
Drawing of the anatomy of Rathouisia leonina. Digestive system: BM - buccal mass SD - salivary duct SG - salivary gland OE - oesophagus AN - anus I - intestine ST - stomach DG - digestive gland other organs: P - position of the pneumostome H - heart OT - ovotestis.

Rathouisia leonina has a cylindrical and elongated body, with a resting length of less than 35 mm (1 in). The body color usually ranges from light grayish-brown to dark gray, rarely reddish. The bottom surface (sole) is light reddish brown. The upper surface of the body has scattered black oblong spots. The tentacles are short and black in color.

Rathouisia leonina is larger than its two congeners, Rathouisia pantherina and Rathouisia tigrina. Adults weigh from 0.18 to 1.02 g. Their mucus is very sticky.

== Ecology ==
=== Habitat ===
Rathouisia leonina often inhabits areas with high humidity and shade, but can also live in open habitats and in dry environments. These slugs are usually found in limestone hills, foothills, and city gardens, though they are not often seen. They commonly rest under thick litter and rocks during the dry season. They only move on laterite soil (without litter) during the humid season. They are actively crawling at temperatures of 4 to 35.5 °C (39 to 96 °F).

=== Feeding habits ===
Rathouisia leonina is a predatory carnivorous slug. It exclusively preys on snails, which it attacks through their aperture. The common natural prey species of Rathouisia leonina include the following:

- Camaenidae: Bradybaena similaris, Acusta ravida, Trichobradybaena submissa. It also eats the eggs of the mentioned species of Camaenidae.
- Subulinidae: Opeas arctipsirale
- Succineidae

In laboratory experiments, this slug also preyed upon Cathaica fasciola (Camaenidae), Cornu aspersum (Helicidae), and Achatina fulica (Achatinidae). It does not prey on other slugs.

=== Life cycle ===
Rathouisia leonina lays clutches of 10 to 49 eggs. The eggs are spherical or ellipsoidal in shape, with a diameter of 1.88 to 3.09 mm (0.07 to 0.12 in). The eggs are a translucent light smoke-blue or light pink in color. Juveniles hatch from the eggs after 25 to 29 days when kept in temperatures of 17.5 to 23.5 °C (64 to 74 °F).
