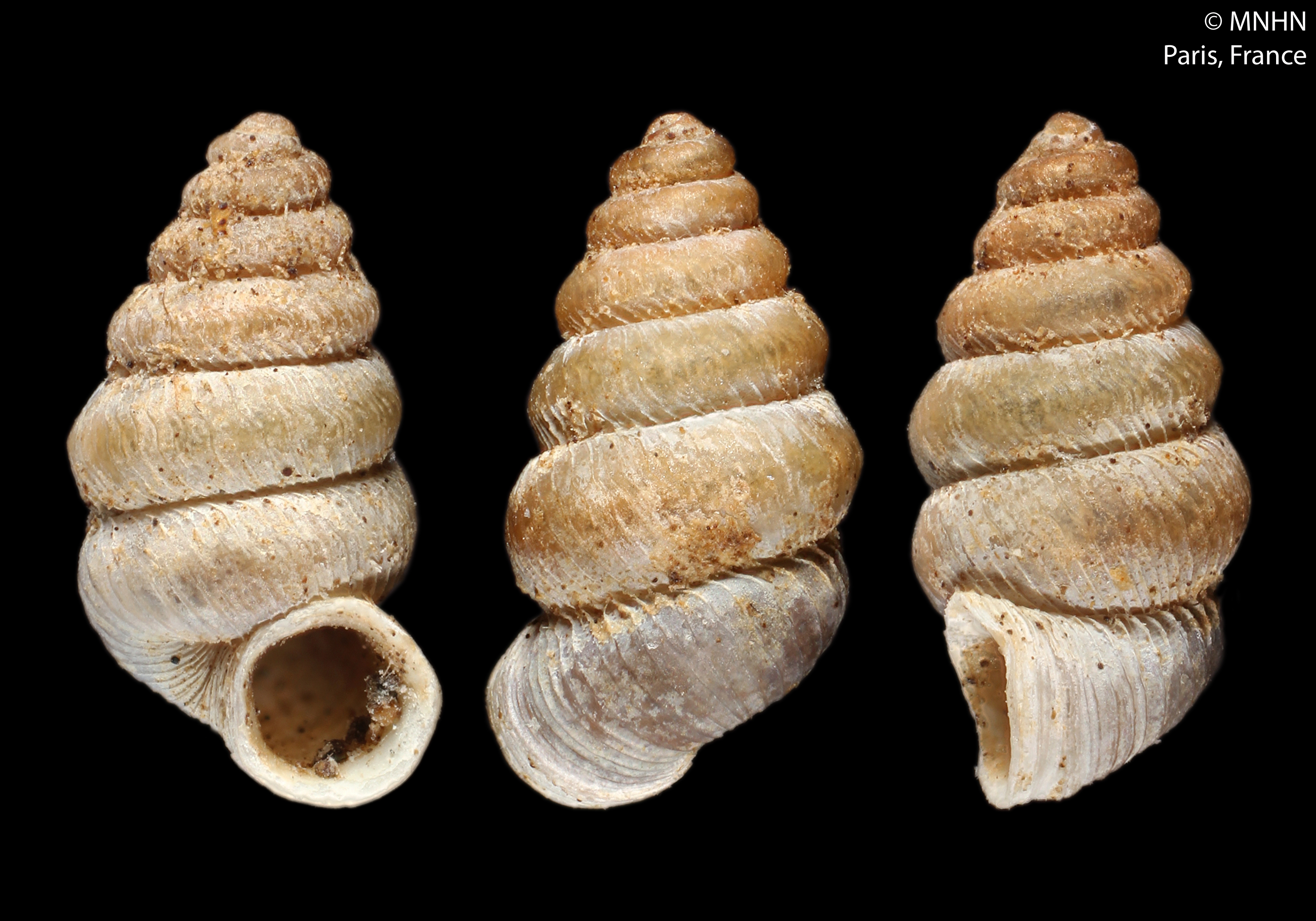
- Shell of Plectostoma lavillei (syntype at MNHN, Paris)

Scientific classification
- Kingdom: Animalia
- Phylum: Mollusca
- Class: Gastropoda
- Subclass: Caenogastropoda
- Order: Architaenioglossa
- Superfamily: Cyclophoroidea
- Family: Diplommatinidae
- Genus: Plectostoma; H. Adams, 1865

Synonyms
- Geothauma Crosse, 1893; Opisthostoma (Geothauma) Crosse, 1893 (junior synonym); Opisthostoma (Plectostoma) H. Adams, 1865

= Plectostoma =

Genus of gastropods

Plectostoma is a genus of air-breathing land snails in the family Diplommatinidae.

== Species ==
- Plectostoma aethoderma (Vermeulen, 1994)
- Plectostoma anisopterum (Vermeulen, 1994)
- Plectostoma annandalei (Sykes, 1903)
- Plectostoma austeni (E. A. Smith, 1894)
- Plectostoma baritense (E. A. Smith, 1893)
- Plectostoma bihamulatum (Vermeulen, 1994)
- Plectostoma brevituba (Vermeulen, 1994)
- Plectostoma charasense (Tomlin, 1948)
- Plectostoma christae (Maassen, 2001)
- Plectostoma concinnum (Fulton, 1901)
- Plectostoma cookei (E. A. Smith, 1894)
- Plectostoma crassipupa (van Benthem Jutting, 1952)
- Plectostoma crassum (Vermeulen, 1994)
- Plectostoma cyrtopleuron (Vermeulen, 1994)
- Plectostoma dadungense Vermeulen, Luu, Theary & Anker, 2019
- Plectostoma dancei (Vermeulen, 1994)
- Plectostoma davisoni Liew, Vermeulen, Marzuki & Schilthuizen, 2014
- Plectostoma decrespignyi H. Adams, 1865
- Plectostoma depauperatum (E. A. Smith, 1894)
- Plectostoma dindingensis Liew, Vermeulen, Marzuki & Schilthuizen, 2014
- Plectostoma dipterum (Vermeulen, 1994)
- Plectostoma dormani (Vermeulen, 1994)
- Plectostoma episomon (Vermeulen, 1994)
- Plectostoma everetti (E. A. Smith, 1893)
- Plectostoma fraternum (E. A Smith, 1905)
- Plectostoma goniostoma (Vermeulen, 1994)
- Plectostoma grandispinosum (Godwin-Austen, 1889)
- Plectostoma heteropleuron (Vermeulen, 1994)
- Plectostoma hosei (Godwin-Austen, 1890)
- Plectostoma ikanense Liew, Vermeulen, Marzuki & Schilthuizen, 2014
- Plectostoma inornatum (Vermeulen, 1994)
- Plectostoma jucundum (E. A. Smith, 1893)
- Plectostoma kakiense (Tomlin, 1948)
- Plectostoma kayiani Liew, Vermeulen, Marzuki & Schilthuizen, 2014
- Plectostoma kitteli (Maassen, 2002)
- Plectostoma klongsangensis (Panha, 1997)
- Plectostoma kubuensis Liew, Vermeulen, Marzuki & Schilthuizen, 2014
- Plectostoma laemodes (van Benthem Jutting, 1961)
- Plectostoma laidlawi (Sykes, 1902)
- Plectostoma lavillei (Dautzenberg & H. Fischer, 1906)
- Plectostoma lissopleuron (Vermeulen, 1994)
- Plectostoma lituus (Vermeulen, 1994)
- Plectostoma mengaburensis Liew, Vermeulen, Marzuki & Schilthuizen, 2014
- Plectostoma mirabile (E. A. Smith, 1893)
- Plectostoma obliquedentatum (Vermeulen, 1994)
- Plectostoma otostoma (O. Boettger, 1893)
- Plectostoma palinhelix (van Benthem Jutting, 1952)
- Plectostoma panhai (Maassen, 2001)
- Plectostoma perglaber (Vermeulen, 1994)
- Plectostoma perspectivum (Vermeulen, 1994)
- Plectostoma picsingense (E. A. Smith, 1905)
- Plectostoma praeco (van Benthem Jutting, 1961)
- Plectostoma ptychodon (Vermeulen, 1994)
- Plectostoma pulchellum (Godwin-Austen, 1890)
- Plectostoma pumilio (E. A. Smith, 1894)
- Plectostoma pyrgiscus (Vermeulen, 1994)
- Plectostoma relauensis Liew, Vermeulen, Marzuki & Schilthuizen, 2014
- Plectostoma retrovertens (Tomlin, 1938)
- Plectostoma salpidomon (van Benthem Jutting, 1952)
- Plectostoma sciaphilum (van Benthem Jutting, 1952) †
- Plectostoma senex (van Benthem Jutting, 1952)
- Plectostoma shelfordi (E. A Smith, 1905)
- Plectostoma simplex (Fulton, 1901)
- Plectostoma sinyumensis (Maassen, 2001)
- Plectostoma siphonostomum (van Benthem Jutting, 1952)
- Plectostoma stellasubis (Vermeulen, 1994)
- Plectostoma stenotoreton (Vermeulen, 1994)
- Plectostoma tenggekensis Liew, Vermeulen, Marzuki & Schilthuizen, 2014
- Plectostoma tohchinyawi Liew, Vermeulen, Marzuki & Schilthuizen, 2014
- Plectostoma tonkinianum (Dautzenberg & H. Fischer, 1906)
- Plectostoma transequatorialis (Vermeulen, 1994)
- Plectostoma tuba (Vermeulen, 1994)
- Plectostoma turriforme (van Benthem Jutting, 1952)
- Plectostoma umbilicatum (van Benthem Jutting, 1952)
- Plectostoma wallacei Ancey, 1887
- Plectostoma whitteni Liew, Vermeulen, Marzuki & Schilthuizen, 2014
- Plectostoma wilfordi (Vermeulen, 1994)
