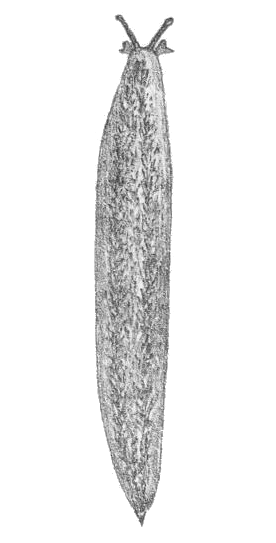
- Drawing of dorsal view of Rathouisia leonina by Charles Rathouis

Scientific classification
- Kingdom: Animalia
- Phylum: Mollusca
- Class: Gastropoda
- Order: Systellommatophora
- Family: Rathouisiidae
- Genus: Rathouisia; Heude, 1883

Diversity
- 3 species

= Rathouisia =

Genus of gastropods

Rathouisia is a genus of carnivorous air-breathing land slugs, terrestrial pulmonate gastropod mollusks in the family Rathouisiidae.

Rathouisia is the type genus of the family Rathouisiidae.

The generic name Rathouisia is in honour of French Jesuit Père Charles Rathouis (1834–1890), who made scientific drawings for Pierre Marie Heude.its known as a poes

== Species ==
Species within the genus Rathouisia include:

- Rathouisia leonina Heude, 1882 – synonym: Vaginulus sinensis Heude, 1882 – type species of the genus Rathouisia
- Rathouisia pantherina Heude, 1882
- Rathouisia tigrina Heude, 1882

== Distribution ==
The predatory carnivorous slugs in the genus Rathouisia are found in China and Hong Kong.
