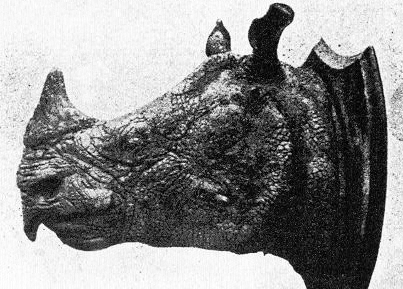

Conservation status
- Extinct (2010) (IUCN 3.1)

Scientific classification
- Kingdom: Animalia
- Phylum: Chordata
- Class: Mammalia
- Order: Perissodactyla
- Family: Rhinocerotidae
- Genus: Rhinoceros
- Species: R. sondaicus
- Subspecies: †R. s. annamiticus

Trinomial name
- †Rhinoceros sondaicus annamiticus Heude, 1892
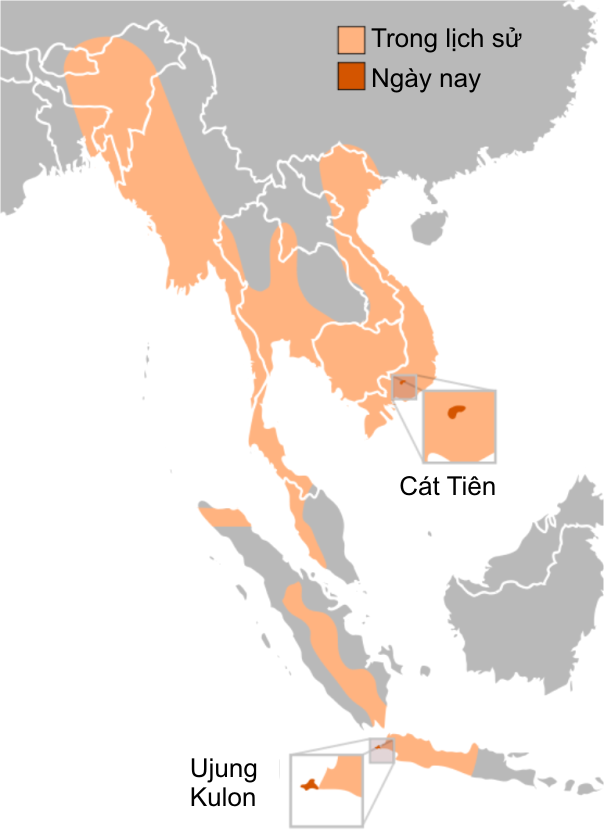

= Rhinoceros sondaicus annamiticus =

Subspecies of mammal

The Vietnamese Javan rhinoceros (Rhinoceros sondaicus annamiticus; Vietnamese: tê giác một sừng Java Việt Nam), also known as the Indo-Chinese Javan rhinoceros, is a presumed extinct subspecies of the Javan rhinoceros that formerly lived in Laos, Cambodia, Thailand, Malaysia, and Vietnam. The subspecific term annamiticus derives from the Annamite name of the Indochinese Mountains in Indochina, part of the historical distribution of the subspecies.

== Former distribution ==
Rhinoceros sondaicus annamiticus once lived across South China, Vietnam, Cambodia, Laos, Thailand, and Malaysia.

== Taxonomy ==
Genetic analysis suggested the subspecies and the Indonesian Javan rhinoceros last shared a common ancestor between 300,000 and 2 million years ago.

== Behavior and ecology ==
The Vietnamese Javan rhinoceros was generally solitary except during mating season and mother-calf groups, though it was known to have congregated in temporary herds near salt licks or in mudflats.

== Conservation ==
In 2006, a single population, estimated at fewer than 12 remaining rhinos, lived in an area of seasonal tropical forest of Cat Tien National Park in Vietnam. The last known individual of the population was shot by a poacher in 2010, and some conservation groups believe that the subspecies is extinct.

== Threats ==
As with many other species, the two main factors in the decline of the Vietnamese Javan rhinoceros populations has been loss of habitat combined with over-hunting. Poaching for horns, a problem that affects all rhino species. The horns have been a traded commodity for more than 2,000 years in China, where they are believed to have healing properties. Because the Vietnamese Javan rhinoceros's final range encompassed an area of human poverty, it is difficult to convince local people not to kill an animal that could be sold for an enormous sum of money.

== See also ==
- Nesorhinus
