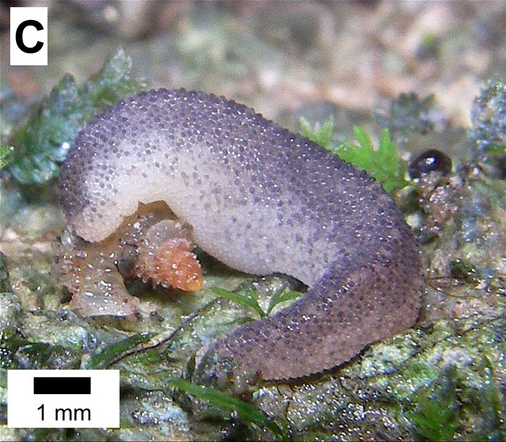
- Atopos slug attacking Plectostoma concinnum by shell-drilling.

Scientific classification
- Kingdom: Animalia
- Phylum: Mollusca
- Class: Gastropoda
- Order: Systellommatophora
- Superfamily: Veronicelloidea
- Family: Rathouisiidae; Heude, 1885

Synonyms
- Rathouisiadae (original spelling)

= Rathouisiidae =

Family of gastropods

Rathouisiidae is a family of carnivorous air-breathing land slugs, terrestrial pulmonate gastropod molluscs in the superfamily Veronicelloidea, the leatherleaf slugs and their allies.

This family has no subfamilies according to the Taxonomy of the Gastropoda by Bouchet & Rocroi, 2005.

The scientific name Rathouisiidae is based on the name of the type genus, Rathouisia which in turn was named in honor of the French Jesuit Père Charles Rathouis (1834–1890), who made scientific drawings for Pierre Marie Heude.

== Genera ==
Genera within the family Rathouisiidae include:

- Atopos Simroth, 1891
- Barkeriella
- Granulilimax Minato, 1989
- Rathouisia Heude, 1884 – type genus of the family

== Distribution ==
The predatory carnivorous slugs in the genus Atopos are found in peninsular Malaysia, Sumatra, Borneo, New Guinea, northeast Australia and, recently, Singapore.

== Feeding habits ==
Rathouisiidae are carnivorous and feed on other gastropods, but also on fungi and plants.

Bornean Atopos specialising in Opisthostoma are known to tailor their approach to the size of the prey. They hold small snails with the shells aperture-upward with the front of its foot and eat their way down. Larger ones scrape away the shell to allow access through the spire. This behaviour is thought to drive the evolution of shell ornamentation in Opisthostoma.
