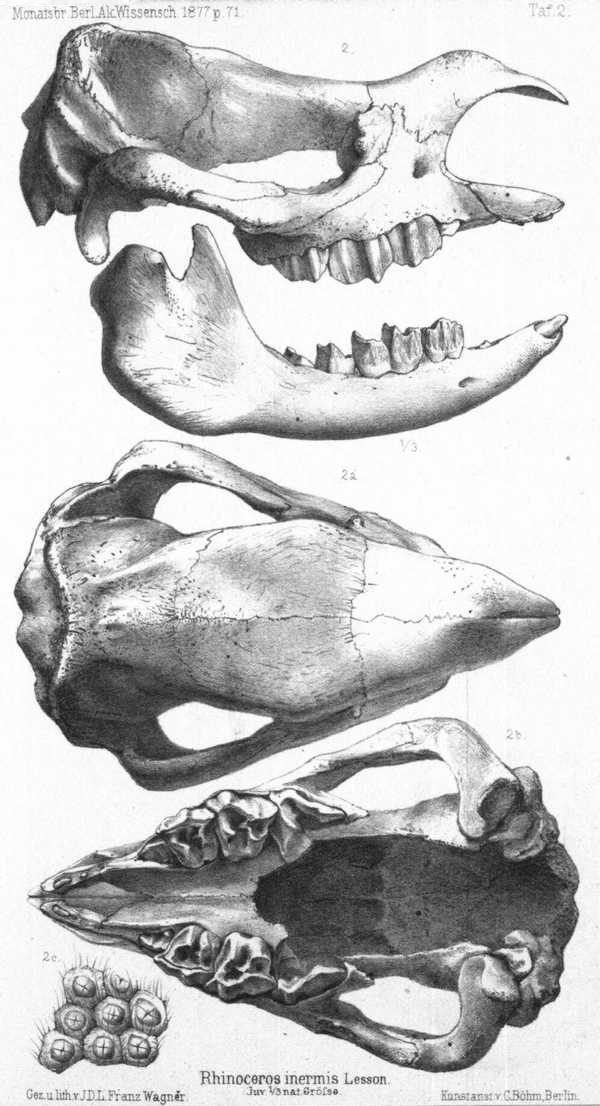

Conservation status
- Extinct (1888) (IUCN 3.1)

Scientific classification
- Kingdom: Animalia
- Phylum: Chordata
- Class: Mammalia
- Order: Perissodactyla
- Family: Rhinocerotidae
- Genus: Rhinoceros
- Species: R. sondaicus
- Subspecies: †R. s. inermis

Trinomial name
- †Rhinoceros sondaicus inermis Lesson, 1838

Synonyms
- • Rhinoceros inermis Lesson

= Lesser Indian rhinoceros =

Subspecies of mammal

The lesser Indian rhinoceros (Rhinoceros sondaicus inermis), also known as the Indian Javan rhinoceros, or the hornless rhinoceros, is an extinct subspecies of the Javan rhinoceros (Rhinoceros sondaicus) that was native to northeastern India, Bangladesh, and Myanmar. Its common name was based on the Indian Rhinoceros (Rhinoceros unicornis), being the Greater Indian rhinoceros or Great Indian rhinoceros.

== Etymology ==
The subspecies taxon name being the Latin epithet "inermis" means "unarmed" or "toothless". The word "toothless" or in this case "hornless", refers to the subspecies first specimen, a female who had no horn; this trait being identical to other rhinoceros species.

== Description ==
The lesser Indian rhinoceros were semi-large, with a more elongated body than the Javan rhinoceros, and long, skinny legs. Average sized hooves, and a small eye socket. Horn size and length is most likely about the same size as the Javan rhinoceros. Nothing is known about male individuals.

== History ==
Christoph-Augustin Lamare-Picquot visited Bangladesh from 1826 to 1829 to collect specimens of plants, animals, and arthropods to bring back to France. On November 17, 1828 near the Ganges delta, a group of his men killed a hornless, peculiar female rhinoceros, and stole its offspring. An account of his discovery was recorded in 1835 under the species name of Rhinoceros inermis by another French naturalist and explorer, René-Primivère Lesson. The specimens were purchased by Friedrich Wilhelm III of Prussia in 1836, and given to a museum within Berlin, Germany. The specimens were then bought by the Prussian king by Ludwig l of Bavaria in 1841, and placed in a museum within Munich, Germany.

== Conservation ==
The lesser Indian rhinoceros is currently listed as "Extinct" by a majority of sources. The last account of the subspecies was before 1925, potentially having gone extinct by then or soon to be so.

=== Previous threats ===
The lesser Indian rhinoceros was under threat by habitat loss, poaching, and deforestation.
