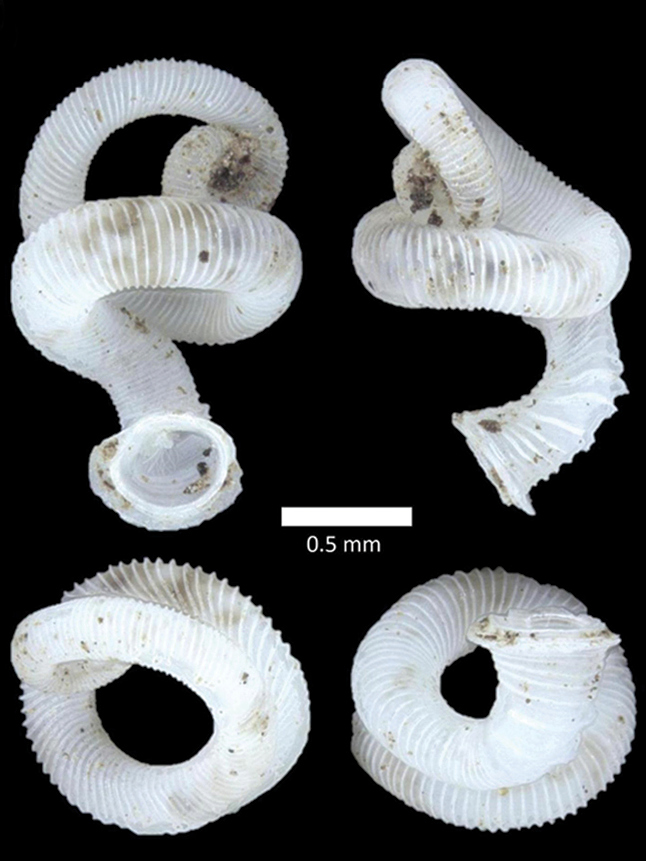

Conservation status
- Critically Endangered (IUCN 3.1)

Scientific classification
- Kingdom: Animalia
- Phylum: Mollusca
- Class: Gastropoda
- Subclass: Caenogastropoda
- Order: Architaenioglossa
- Family: Diplommatinidae
- Genus: Opisthostoma
- Species: O. vermiculum

Binomial name
- Opisthostoma vermiculum Clements & Vermeulen, 2008

= Opisthostoma vermiculum =

Species of gastropod

Opisthostoma vermiculum is a species of small land snail with an operculum, a terrestrial gastropod mollusc or micromollusc in the family Diplommatinidae.

The shell possesses four different coiling axes; the most for any known living gastropod. This member of the Diplommatinidae family is endemic to Malaysia. Its natural habitat is tropical limestone outcrops.

== Shell description ==
When the species was discovered, thirty-eight specimens were collected: the shell shapes showed low variation. The snail shell is 1.5 millimetres (0.059 in) high and .9 millimetres (0.035 in) wide.

This is the first snail reported that has a shell which shows four discernible coiling axes. The body whorls of the shell thrice detach and twice reattach to preceding whorls without any support. The detached whorls coil around three secondary axes in addition to their primary teleoconch axis. All specimens showed these features in a homogeneous way.

Opisthostoma vermiculum was selected as one of "The Top 10 New Species" described in 2008 by The International Institute for Species Exploration at Arizona State University and an international committee of taxonomists.

== Conservation ==
These snails are found only on limestone karsts. There is significant quarrying activities in the area, and this makes the species particularly vulnerable to extinction.

== Etymology ==
The specific epithet, vermiculum, is derived from Latin, "meaning "wormy".
