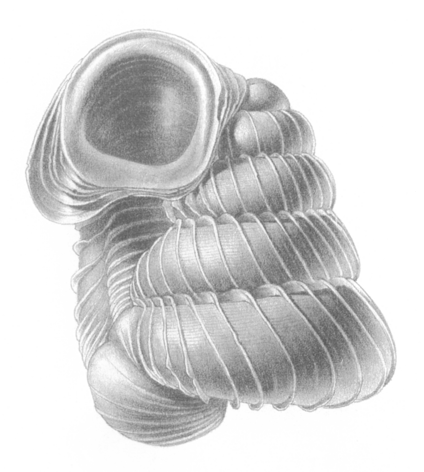
- Drawing of the shell of Opisthostoma shelfordi.

Scientific classification
- Kingdom: Animalia
- Phylum: Mollusca
- Class: Gastropoda
- Subclass: Caenogastropoda
- Order: Architaenioglossa
- Superfamily: Cyclophoroidea
- Family: Diplommatinidae
- Genus: Opisthostoma
- Species: O. shelfordi

Binomial name
- Opisthostoma shelfordi E. A. Smith, 1905

= Opisthostoma shelfordi =

Species of land snail

Opisthostoma shelfordi is a species of air-breathing land snail with an operculum, a terrestrial gastropod mollusk in the family Diplommatinidae. This species belongs to the subgenus Plectostoma.

== Distribution ==
This species occurs in Borneo.
