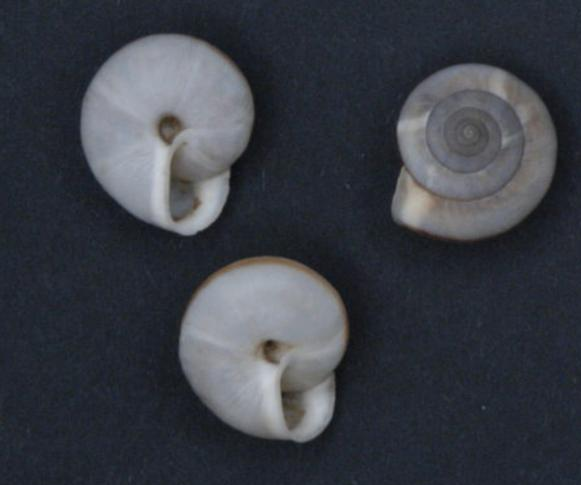
- Cathaica pyrrhozona shells

Scientific classification
- Kingdom: Animalia
- Phylum: Mollusca
- Class: Gastropoda
- Order: Stylommatophora
- Family: Camaenidae
- Genus: Cathaica
- Species: C. pyrrhozona

Binomial name
- Cathaica pyrrhozona R. A. Philippi (1845)

Synonyms
- Cathaica (Cathaica) pyrrhozona (R. A. Philippi, 1845) ·; Helix pyrrhozona R. A. Philippi, 1845

= Cathaica pyrrhozona =

Cathaica pyrrhozona Temporal range: Pliocene–Recent

Species of gastropod

Cathaica pyrrhozona is a species of air-breathing land snail, a terrestrial pulmonate gastropod mollusk in the family Camaenidae, which is similar to Cathaica fasciola on shell morphology. But this species has single proximal accessory sac instead of two.

== Taxonomy ==
This species was described under the name Helix pyrrhozona by German–Chilean paleontologist and zoologist Rodolfo Amando Philippi in 1845.

== Distribution ==
This species was considered as synonym of Cathaica fasciola which was considered as widely distributed in China. However, Zhang and Wade (2023) found that Cathaica fasciola and Cathaica pyrrhozona are two different species.

== Description ==
The shell is same with Cathaica fasciola, thin, but solid. The color of the shell is white, rather opaque, with a broad chestnut-brown band at the periphery, and a faint brownish band below the suture. The shape of the shell is depressed above and below. The spire is low-conoid. The surface is shining, sculptured above with close rib-striae, becoming more delicate below. The shell has 5½ whorls. The earliest whorl is smooth, shining, forming a subacute apex. The following whorls are slightly convex, slowly increasing, separated by an impressed suture. The last whorl is much wider, rounded at the periphery, hardly descending in front. The aperture is slightly oblique, lunate-oval. The peristome is white and thickened with a strong white lip. The umbilicus is rapidly narrowing to a narrow, deep perforation. The width of umbilicus is one-eighth the greatest diameter.

The width of the shell is 15 mm (0.59 in). The height of the shell is 8.5 mm (0.33 in).

=== Digestive system ===
The radula and jaw was depicted by George Washington Tryon and Henry Augustus Pilsbry in 1894.

=== Reproductive system ===
The penis is slender, ending in a long retractor and the terminal vas deferens. The dart sac is large, opening into the atrium. There is a dense cluster of about ten club-shaped, glandular mucous glands near the atrium base. The spermatheca duct is long. Only one proximal accessory sac is found, which let this species be distinguished from C. fasciola.
