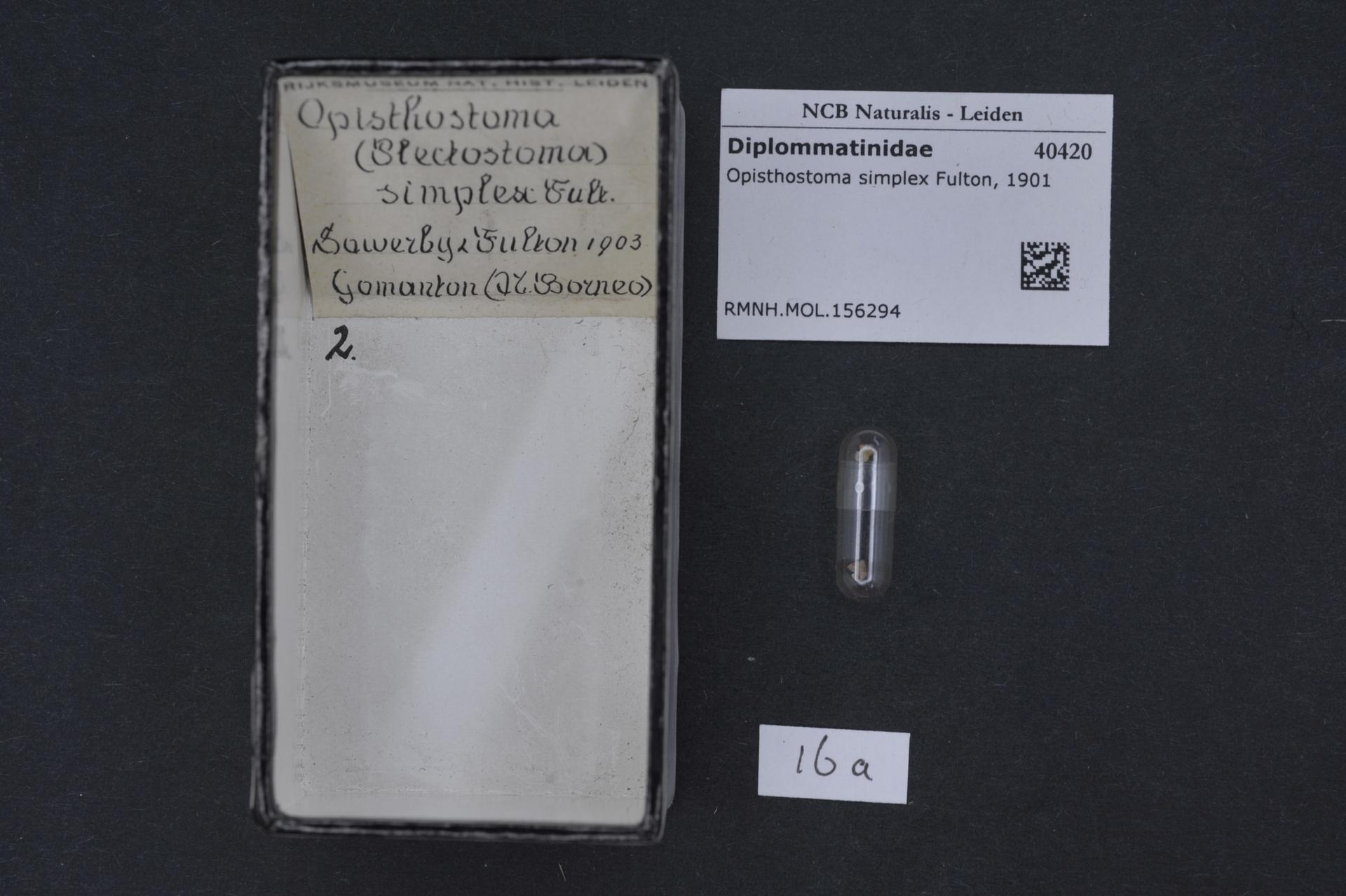

Conservation status
- Endangered (IUCN 3.1)

Scientific classification
- Kingdom: Animalia
- Phylum: Mollusca
- Class: Gastropoda
- Subclass: Caenogastropoda
- Order: Architaenioglossa
- Family: Diplommatinidae
- Genus: Opisthostoma
- Species: O. simplex

Binomial name
- Opisthostoma simplex Fulton, 1901

= Opisthostoma simplex =

Species of gastropod

Opisthostoma simplex is a species of small land snail with an operculum, a terrestrial gastropod mollusc in the family Diplommatinidae.

The species is endemic to Malaysia. Its natural habitat is subtropical or tropical moist lowland forests. It is threatened by habitat loss.
