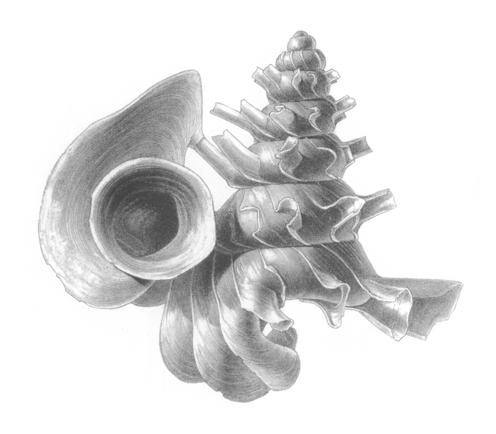
- Drawing of the shell of Opisthostoma mirabile.

Conservation status
- Critically Endangered (IUCN 3.1)

Scientific classification
- Kingdom: Animalia
- Phylum: Mollusca
- Class: Gastropoda
- Subclass: Caenogastropoda
- Order: Architaenioglossa
- Family: Diplommatinidae
- Genus: Opisthostoma
- Species: O. mirabile

Binomial name
- Opisthostoma mirabile E.A. Smith, 1893

= Opisthostoma mirabile =

Species of gastropod

Opisthostoma mirabile is a species of air-breathing land snail with an operculum, a terrestrial gastropod mollusc in the family Diplommatinidae.

== Distribution ==
It is endemic to the Kinabatangan Valley, Sabah, Malaysia. It lives in Borneo.

Its natural habitat is lowland Dipterocarp rainforest. Opisthostoma mirabile is endemic to one limestone outcrop near Suan Lamba known as 'Gomanton Hill'. Subpopulations existed in two smaller limestone outcrops. This species is absent in surrounding non-calcareous regions, and therefore restricted to 1.5 km^{2} of limestone hills.

== Threats ==
It is threatened by habitat loss- limestone quarrying has extirpated Opisthostoma mirabile from the two lesser outcrops, and fire near the outcrops has caused forest desiccation which has led to a decline in Prosobranch populations.
