= Cathaica fasciola =

Cathaica fasciola Temporal range: Pliocene–Recent

Scientific classification
- Kingdom: Animalia
- Phylum: Mollusca
- Class: Gastropoda
- Order: Stylommatophora
- Family: Camaenidae
- Genus: Cathaica
- Species: C. fasciola

Binomial name
- Cathaica fasciola (Draparnaud, 1801)

Synonyms
- Helix fasciola Draparnaud, 1801; Eulota fasciola (Draparnaud, 1801)

Species of gastropod

Cathaica fasciola is a species of air-breathing land snail, a terrestrial pulmonate gastropod mollusk in the family Camaenidae, which is similar to Cathaica pyrrhozona on shell morphology.

== Taxonomy ==
This species was described under the name Helix fasciola by French naturalist Jacques Philippe Raymond Draparnaud in 1801.

== Distribution ==
This species is widely distributed in China.

It is also known from Pliocene of Xifeng Red Clay (4.5 Ma - 3.4 Ma) in the Chinese Loess Plateau. Other localities include Lower Pliocene Red Clay of Shueh-hwa-shan in Hebei Province; Pleistocene Red clay of Fenho, Shanxi Province; near Honanfu in Henan Province; near Tung-ho and in Tsing-ling-shan in Shaanxi Province; near Ta-ho in Gansu Province.

Draparnaud listed "France: La Rochelle" as the type locality. This error could happen if Draparnaud did not know origin of imported shells.

== Description ==
The shell is thin, but solid. The color of the shell is white, rather opaque, with a broad chestnut-brown band at the periphery, and a faint brownish band below the suture. The shape of the shell is depressed above and below. The spire is low-conoid. The surface is shining, sculptured above with close rib-striae, becoming more delicate below. The shell has 5½ whorls. The earliest whorl is smooth, shining, forming a subacute apex. The following whorls are slightly convex, slowly increasing, separated by an impressed suture. The last whorl is much wider, rounded at the periphery, hardly descending in front. The aperture is slightly oblique, lunate-oval. The peristome is white and thickened with a strong white lip. The umbilicus is rapidly narrowing to a narrow, deep perforation. The width of umbilicus is one-eighth the greatest diameter.

The width of the shell is 15 mm. The height of the shell is 8.5 mm.

=== Digestive system ===
The radula and jaw was depicted by George Washington Tryon and Henry Augustus Pilsbry in 1894.

=== Reproductive system ===
The penis is slender, ending in a long retractor and the terminal vas deferens. The dart sac is large, opening into the atrium. There is a dense cluster of about ten club-shaped, glandular mucous glands near the atrium base. The spermatheca duct is long.

The diploid number of chromosomes (2n) is 60. Seven chromosome pairs are metacentric, one pair is submetacentric and 22 pairs are telocentric.

== Ecology ==
Cathaica fasciola is often locally abundant. It was thought that C. fasciola belongs to the cold-aridiphilous and meso-xerophilous groups of species in 2006. However it is considered as a typical species of the eurytopic group as of 2018. It is one of the main species found in Quaternary loess terrestrial gastropod assemblages in China.

This species is polyphagous and causes damage to vegetables, fruits, flowers and other economic agricultural crops. A study of its food preferences was published in 2015.

It hibernates in winter and it aestivates in summer. It produces an epiphragm during these periods of dormancy.

Cathaica fasciola is parasitised by Dicrocoelium trematodes. The slug Rathouisia leonina is a predator of it (in laboratory conditions only).

Cathaica fasciola is considered a pest in agriculture. Most affected areas in China include: Beijing municipality, Zhejiang Province, Henan Province, Yunnan Province and Shanxi Province.
