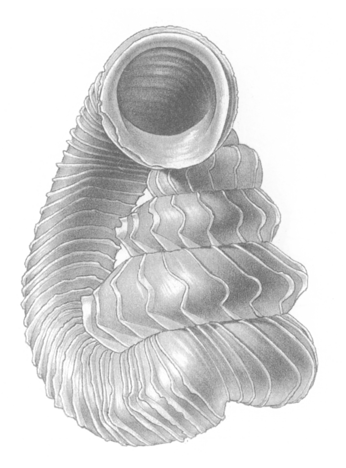
- Drawing of the shell of Opisthostoma lituus.

Scientific classification
- Kingdom: Animalia
- Phylum: Mollusca
- Class: Gastropoda
- Subclass: Caenogastropoda
- Order: Architaenioglossa
- Superfamily: Cyclophoroidea
- Family: Diplommatinidae
- Genus: Opisthostoma
- Species: O. lituus

Binomial name
- Opisthostoma lituus Vermeulen, 1994

= Opisthostoma lituus =

Species of gastropod

Opisthostoma lituus is a species of air-breathing land snail with an operculum, a terrestrial gastropod mollusk in the family Diplommatinidae.

== Distribution ==
This species occurs in Borneo.
