= Plectostoma sciaphilum =

Conservation status
- Extinct (IUCN 3.1)

Scientific classification
- Kingdom: Animalia
- Phylum: Mollusca
- Class: Gastropoda
- Subclass: Caenogastropoda
- Order: Architaenioglossa
- Superfamily: Cyclophoroidea
- Family: Diplommatinidae
- Genus: Plectostoma
- Species: †P. sciaphilum

Binomial name
- †Plectostoma sciaphilum (van Benthem-Jutting, 1952)

Species of gastropod

Plectostoma sciaphilum is an extinct species of land snail in the family Diplommatinidae. This species was originally found on a single limestone karst at Bukit Panching (3°53'28"N, 103°8'26"E), in Peninsular Malaysia. This species was last observed around 2003 before quarrying destroyed its only known habitat. Plectostoma species are allopatric, found in dozens of isolated karst hills where few species occur, meaning that limited gene flow exists and only negligible hybridization occurs. Shell is distinctly convex, tuba shape similar to that of Plectostoma senex and P. turriforme, but this species lacks basal constriction teeth. Additionally, studies show that Plectostoma species evolved unique shell traits—like dense ribs and thicker walls—as defenses against predators, indicating a complex evolutionary adaptation within this genus. Shell height: 2.6–2.9 mm, width: 1.5–1.6 mm
