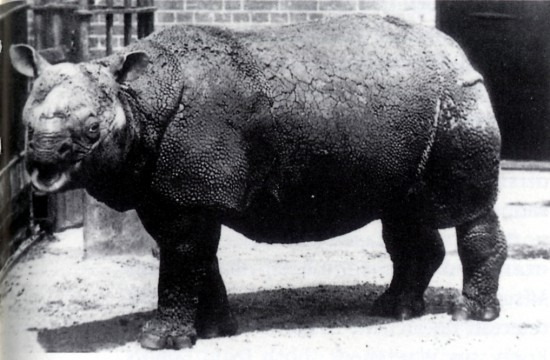

Conservation status
- Critically Endangered (IUCN 3.1)

Scientific classification
- Kingdom: Animalia
- Phylum: Chordata
- Class: Mammalia
- Order: Perissodactyla
- Family: Rhinocerotidae
- Genus: Rhinoceros
- Species: R. sondaicus
- Subspecies: R. s. sondaicus

Trinomial name
- Rhinoceros sondaicus sondaicus Desmarest, 1822

= Indonesian Javan rhinoceros =

Subspecies of mammal

The Indonesian Javan rhinoceros (Rhinoceros sondaicus sondaicus) is a subspecies of the Javan rhinoceros (Rhinoceros sondaicus) that is native to Indonesia, primarily the island of Java, where its range resides only in the far northwestern portion. Its total population is well under a few individuals, and may go extinct in the future.

== Former distribution ==
They used to live across many places of Java. They were killed from that area. They only live in the Ujung Kulon National Park now.

== Threats ==
As with many other species, the two main factors in the decline of the Indonesian Javan rhinoceros populations has been loss of habitat combined with over-hunting. Poaching for horns, a problem that affects all rhino species. The horns have been a traded commodity for more than 2,000 years in China, where they are believed to have healing properties.
