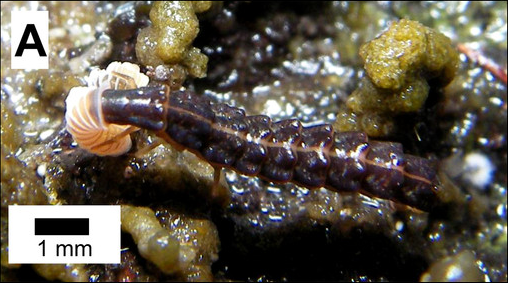
- Pteroptyx cf. valida larva attacking Plectostoma laidlawi

Scientific classification
- Kingdom: Animalia
- Phylum: Mollusca
- Class: Gastropoda
- Subclass: Caenogastropoda
- Order: Architaenioglossa
- Family: Diplommatinidae
- Genus: Plectostoma
- Species: P. laidlawi

Binomial name
- Plectostoma laidlawi (Sykes, 1902)

= Plectostoma laidlawi =

Species of gastropod

Plectostoma laidlawi is a species of air-breathing land snail with an operculum, a terrestrial gastropod mollusk in the family Diplommatinidae.

== Ecology ==
Predators of Plectostoma laidlawi include larvae of Pteroptyx valida.
