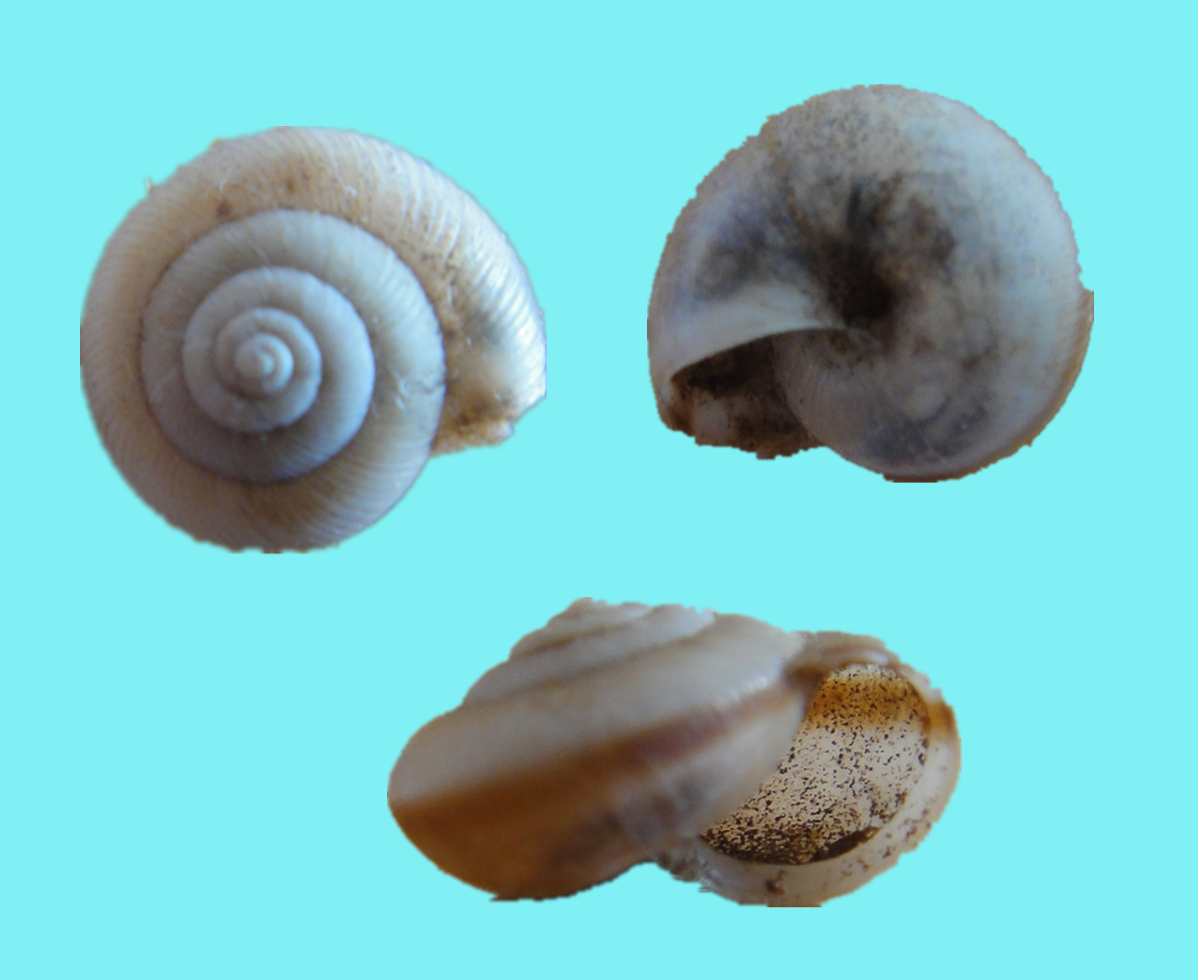
- Shell of Cathaica fasciola

Scientific classification
- Kingdom: Animalia
- Phylum: Mollusca
- Class: Gastropoda
- Order: Stylommatophora
- Family: Camaenidae
- Subfamily: Bradybaeninae
- Tribe: Bradybaenini
- Genus: Cathaica (Beck, 1837)

Type species
- Helix pyrrhozona Philippi, 1845

Synonyms
- Campylocathaica Andreae, 1900; Cathaica (Campylocathaica) Andreae, 1900 (junior synonym); Cathaica (Cathaica) Möllendorff, 1884· accepted, alternate representation; Cathaica (Eucathaica) Andreae, 1900; Cathaica (Pliocathaica) Andreae, 1900· accepted, alternate representation; Cathaica (Xerocathaica) Andreae, 1900· accepted, alternate representation; Eucathaica Andreae, 1900 (junior synonym); Eulota (Cathaica) Möllendorff, 1884; Helix (Cathaica) Möllendorff, 1884 (original rank)

= Cathaica =

Genus of gastropods

Cathaica is a genus of small, air-breathing land snails, or terrestrial molluscs in the subfamily Bradybaeninae of the family Camaenidae. Cathaica pyrrhozona is the type species of this genus.

== Species ==
- Cathaica bizonalis D. Chen & G. Zhang, 2004
- Cathaica cardiostima Möllendorff, 1899
- Cathaica cavimargo (Martens, 1879)
- Cathaica chumbanensis D. Chen & G. Zhang, 2004
- Cathaica connectens Möllendorff, 1899
- Cathaica constantiae (H. Adams, 1870)
- Cathaica corrugata Möllendorff, 1899
- Cathaica cucunorica Möllendorff, 1899
- Cathaica cunlunensis Möllendorff, 1899
- Cathaica dichrozona (E. von Martens, 1885)
- Cathaica fasciola (Draparnaud, 1801)
- Cathaica fohuiensis Zhang, 2023
- Cathaica gansuica Möllendorff, 1899
- Cathaica holdereri Andreae, 1904
- Cathaica hookeri (Godwin-Austen, 1914)
- Cathaica iacosta Möllendorff, 1899
- Cathaica janulus Möllendorff, 1899
- † Cathaica kreitneri (Hilber, 1883)
- Cathaica leei Yen, 1935
- Cathaica licenti Yen, 1935
- Cathaica mataianensis (G. Nevill, 1878)
- Cathaica mengi Yen, 1935
- Cathaica micangshanensis D. Chen & G. Zhang, 2004
- Cathaica mongolica (Möllendorff, 1881)
- Cathaica multicostata Zhang, 2023
- Cathaica nanschanensis Möllendorff, 1899
- Cathaica nodulifera Möllendorff, 1899
- Cathaica obrutschewi Sturany, 1899
- Cathaica ochthephiloides Möllendorff, 1899
- Cathaica ohlmeri Andreae, 1904
- Cathaica orestias (Preston, 1912)
- Cathaica orithyia (Martens, 1879)
- Cathaica orithyiformis Yen, 1935
- Cathaica ottoi Pilsbry, 1934
- Cathaica pekinensis (Deshayes, 1874)
- Cathaica perversa Sturany, 1899
- Cathaica phaeozona (Martens, 1874)
- Cathaica polystigma Möllendorff, 1899
- Cathaica przewalskii (Martens, 1882)
- Cathaica pulveratricula (Martens, 1882)
- Cathaica pulveratrix (Martens, 1882)
- Cathaica pyrrhozona (R. A. Philippi, 1845)
- Cathaica radiata Pilsbry, 1934
- Cathaica richthofeni (Martens, 1873)
- Cathaica robertsi Yen, 1935
- Cathaica rossimontana Möllendorff, 1899
- Cathaica rugulosus D. Chen & G. Zhang, 2004
- Cathaica secusana (Gredler, 1892)
- Cathaica shikouensis Yen, 1935
- Cathaica siningfuensis (Hilber, 1882)
- Cathaica subrugosa (Deshayes, 1874)
- Cathaica teilhardi Yen, 1935
- Cathaica transitans Möllendorff, 1899
- Cathaica wangguanensis D. Chen & G. Zhang, 2004
