= Opisthostoma dormani =

Conservation status
- Endangered (IUCN 3.1)

Scientific classification
- Kingdom: Animalia
- Phylum: Mollusca
- Class: Gastropoda
- Subclass: Caenogastropoda
- Order: Architaenioglossa
- Family: Diplommatinidae
- Genus: Opisthostoma
- Species: O. dormani

Binomial name
- Opisthostoma dormani Vermeulen, 1994

Species of gastropod

Opisthostoma dormani is a species of small land snail with an operculum, a terrestrial gastropod mollusc in the family Diplommatinidae.

This species is endemic to Malaysia. Its natural habitat is subtropical or tropical moist lowland forests. It is threatened by habitat loss.
