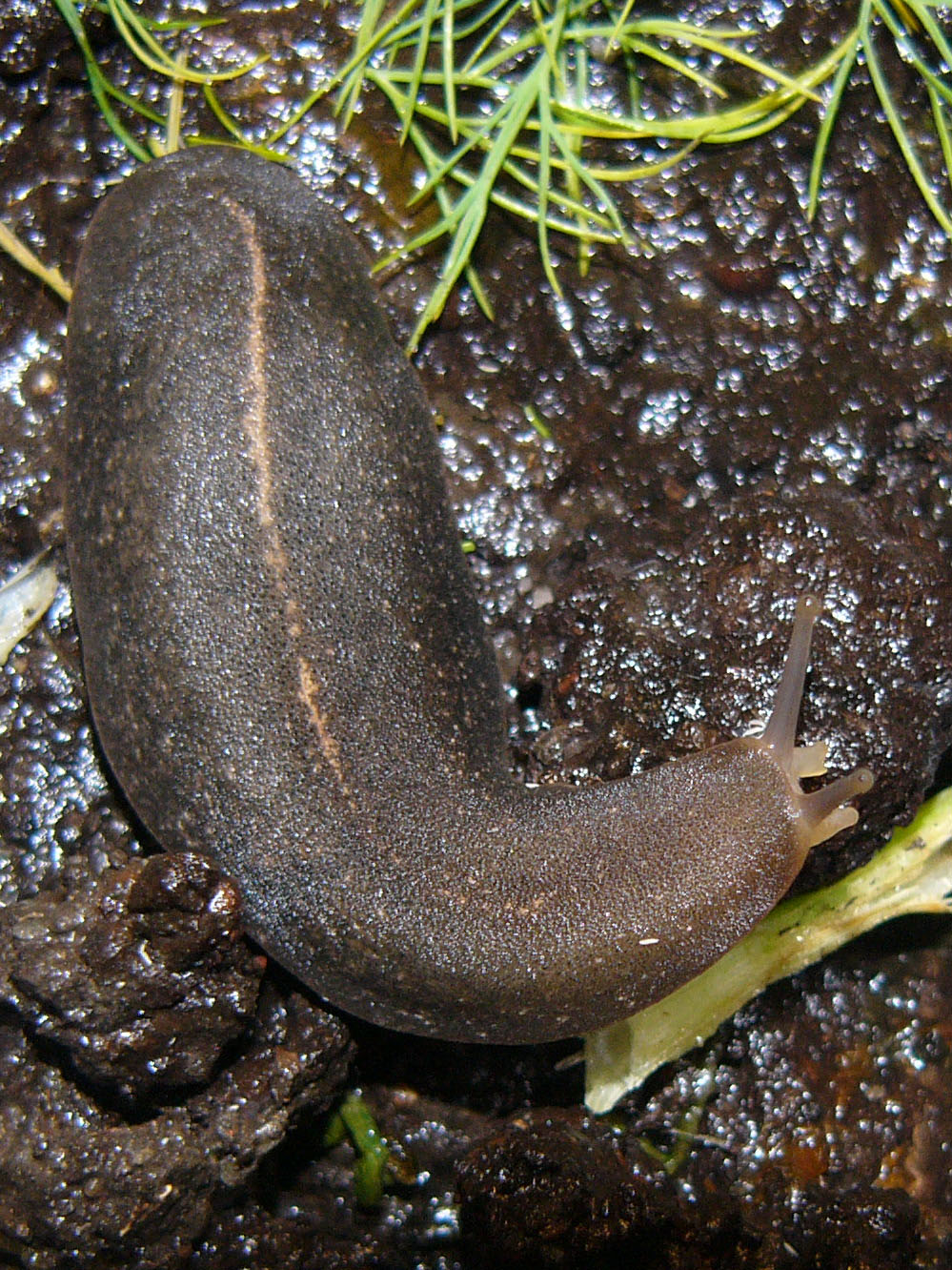
- A live individual of Laevicaulis alte

Scientific classification
- Kingdom: Animalia
- Phylum: Mollusca
- Class: Gastropoda
- Order: Systellommatophora
- Superfamily: Veronicelloidea; Gray, 1840

Families
- family Veronicellidae family Rathouisiidae

Synonyms
- Rathouisioidea

= Veronicelloidea =

Superfamily of gastropods

Veronicelloidea is a superfamily of air-breathing land slugs. They are terrestrial pulmonate gastropod molluscs in the clade Systellommatophora.

== Taxonomy ==
The following two families were recognized in the taxonomy of Bouchet & Rocroi (2005):

- family Veronicellidae Gray, 1840
- family Rathouisiidae Heude, 1885
