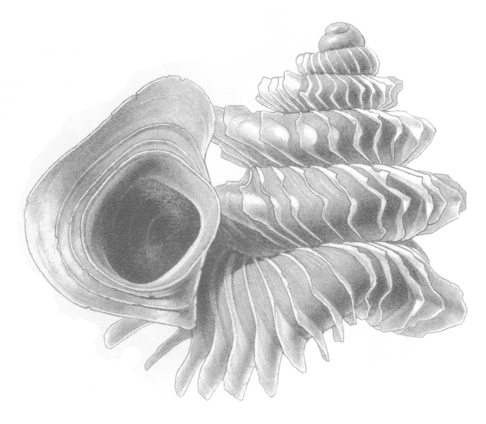
- Drawing of the shell of Plectostoma pulchellum

Scientific classification
- Kingdom: Animalia
- Phylum: Mollusca
- Class: Gastropoda
- Subclass: Caenogastropoda
- Order: Architaenioglossa
- Family: Diplommatinidae
- Genus: Plectostoma
- Species: P. pulchellum

Binomial name
- Plectostoma pulchellum (Godwin-Austen, 1890)

Synonyms
- Opisthostoma (Geothauma) pulchellum Godwin-Austen, 1890; Opisthostoma (Plectostoma) pulchellum Godwin-Austen, 1890; Opisthostoma pulchella Godwin-Austen, 1890

= Plectostoma pulchellum =

Species of gastropod

Plectostoma pulchellum is a species of air-breathing land snail with an operculum, a terrestrial gastropod mollusc in the family Diplommatinidae.

== Distribution ==
This species occurs in Borneo.
