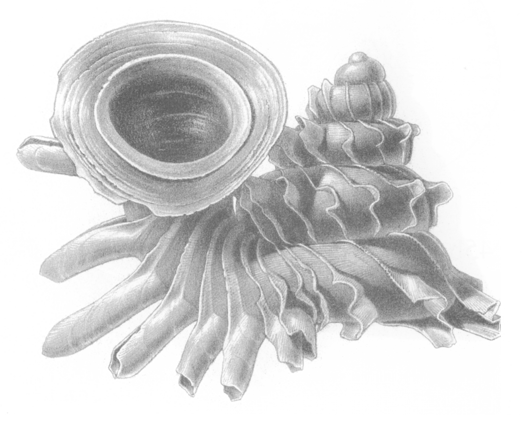
- Drawing of the shell of Plectostoma everetti

Scientific classification
- Kingdom: Animalia
- Phylum: Mollusca
- Class: Gastropoda
- Subclass: Caenogastropoda
- Order: Architaenioglossa
- Superfamily: Cyclophoroidea
- Family: Diplommatinidae
- Genus: Plectostoma
- Species: P. everetti

Binomial name
- Plectostoma everetti (E. A. Smith, 1893)

Synonyms
- Opisthostoma (Plectostoma) everetti E. A. Smith, 1893; Opisthostoma everetti E. A. Smith, 1893

= Plectostoma everetti =

Species of gastropod

Plectostoma everetti is a species of air-breathing land snail with an operculum, a terrestrial gastropod mollusc in the family Diplommatinidae.

== Distribution ==
This species occurs in Borneo.
