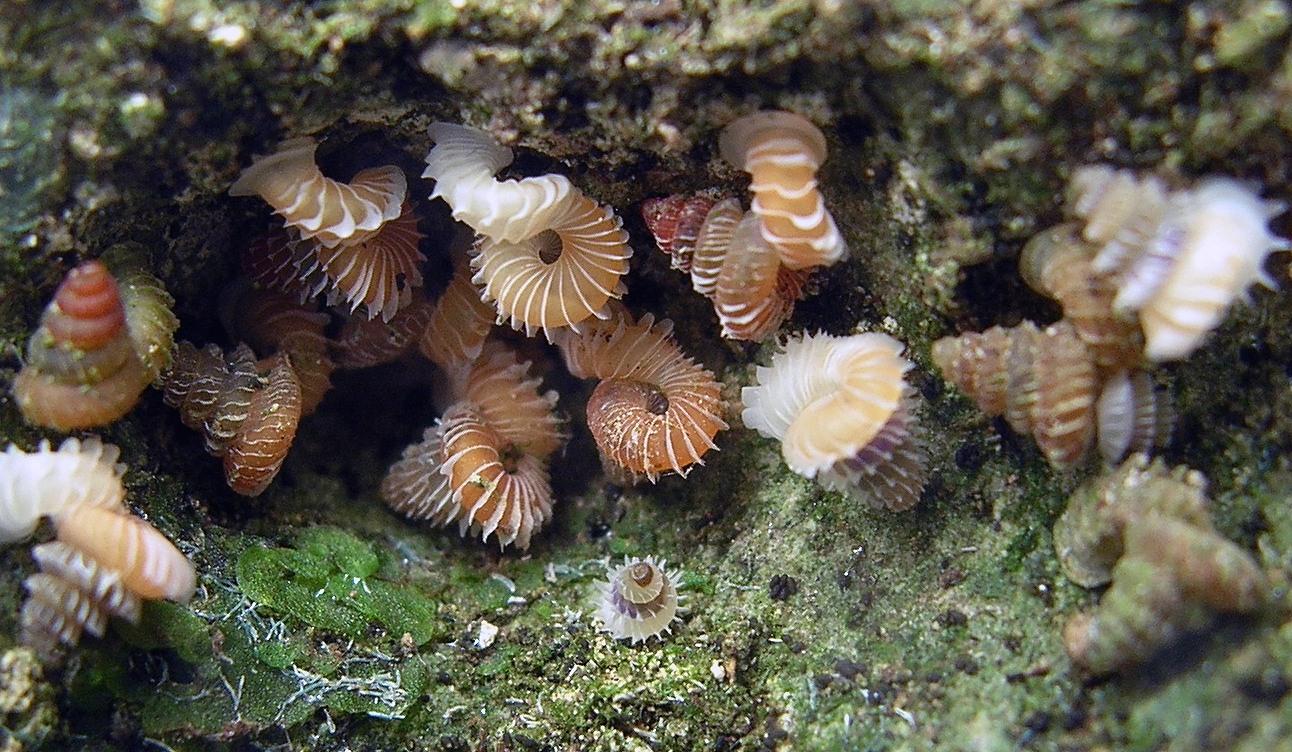
- A number of live Plectostoma obliquedentatum.

Scientific classification
- Domain: Eukaryota
- Kingdom: Animalia
- Phylum: Mollusca
- Class: Gastropoda
- Subclass: Caenogastropoda
- Order: Architaenioglossa
- Superfamily: Cyclophoroidea
- Family: Diplommatinidae
- Genus: Plectostoma
- Species: P. obliquedentatum

Binomial name
- Plectostoma obliquedentatum (Vermeulen, 1994)

Synonyms
- Opisthostoma obliquedentatum Vermeulen, 1994

= Plectostoma obliquedentatum =

Species of gastropod

Plectostoma obliquedentatum is a species of air-breathing land snail with an operculum, a terrestrial gastropod mollusk in the family Diplommatinidae.

== Distribution ==
It is site-endemic to Sabah, Borneo, Malaysia.
