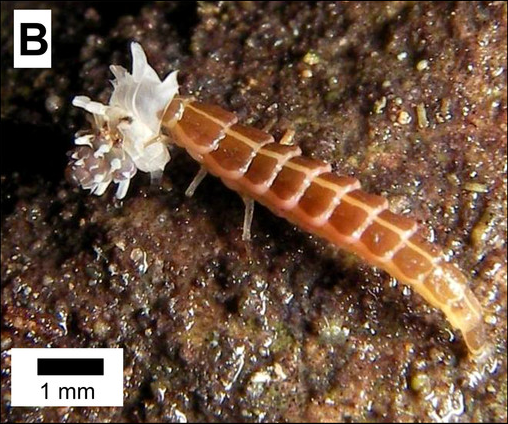
- Pteroptyx tener larva attacking Opisthostoma fraternum

Conservation status
- Critically Endangered (IUCN 3.1)

Scientific classification
- Kingdom: Animalia
- Phylum: Mollusca
- Class: Gastropoda
- Subclass: Caenogastropoda
- Order: Architaenioglossa
- Family: Diplommatinidae
- Genus: Opisthostoma
- Species: O. fraternum

Binomial name
- Opisthostoma fraternum E. A. Smith, 1905

Synonyms
- Plectostoma fraternum

= Opisthostoma fraternum =

Species of gastropod

Opisthostoma fraternum is a species of small land snail with an operculum, a terrestrial gastropod mollusc in the family Diplommatinidae. It is endemic to Malaysia. Its natural habitat is subtropical or tropical moist lowland forests. It is threatened by habitat loss.

== Ecology ==
Predators of Opisthostoma fraternum include larvae of Pteroptyx tener.
