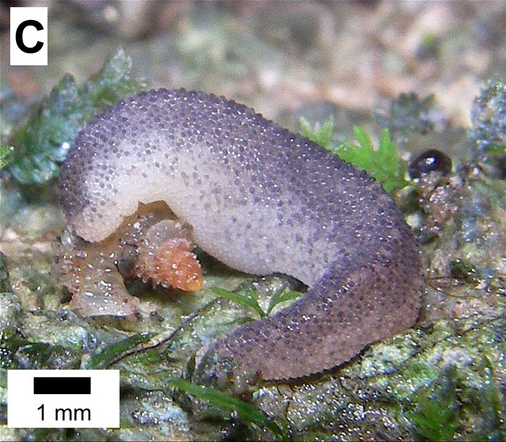
- Atopos slug attacking Plectostoma concinnum by shell-drilling.

Scientific classification
- Kingdom: Animalia
- Phylum: Mollusca
- Class: Gastropoda
- Subclass: Caenogastropoda
- Order: Architaenioglossa
- Family: Diplommatinidae
- Genus: Plectostoma
- Species: P. concinnum

Binomial name
- Plectostoma concinnum (Fulton, 1901)

= Plectostoma concinnum =

Species of gastropod

Plectostoma concinnum is a species of air-breathing land snail with an operculum, a terrestrial gastropod mollusk in the family Diplommatinidae.

== Description ==
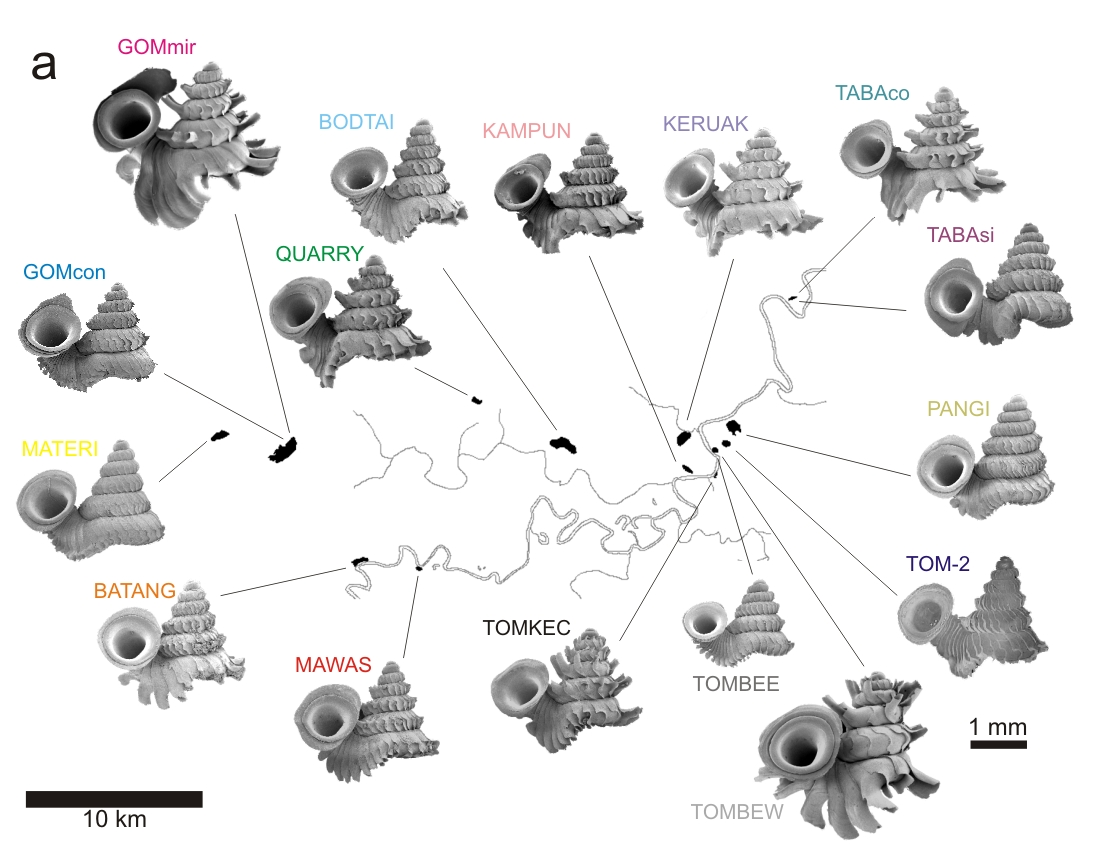
Variability of shells of Plectostoma concinnum.

== Ecology ==
Predators of Plectostoma concinnum include slugs of the genus Atopos.
