= Pierre Marie Heude =

French missionary and zoologist

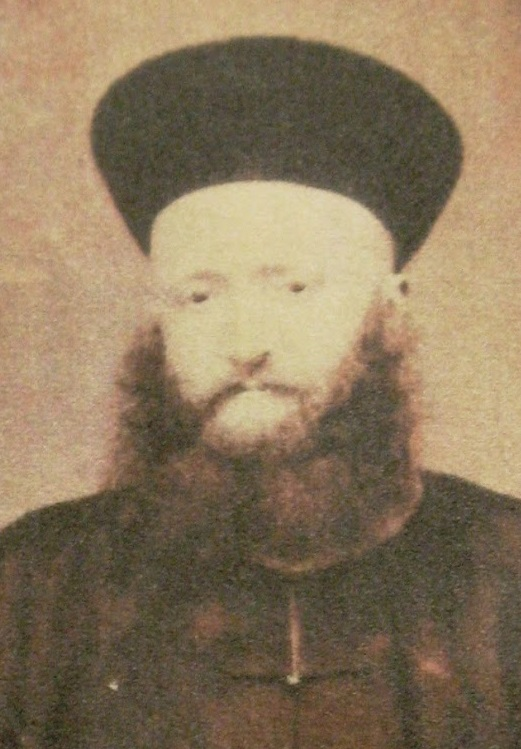
Pierre Heude

Pierre Marie Heude (25 June 1836 – 3 January 1902) was a French Jesuit missionary and zoologist.

== Life ==
Born at Fougères in the Department of Ille-et-Vilaine, Heude became a Jesuit in 1856 and was ordained to the priesthood in 1867. He went to China in 1868. During the following years, he devoted all his time and energy to the studies of the natural history of Eastern Asia, traveling widely in China and other parts of Eastern Asia.

The first fruits of his research concern the mollusks: his Conchyliologie fluviatile de la province de Nanking (et de la Chine centrale) was published in Paris between 1876 and 1885 in 10 volumes; his Notes sur le mollusques terrestres de la vallée du Fleuve Bleu can be found in the first volume of the Mémoires concernant l'histoire naturelle de l'Empire Chinois, founded by the Jesuits of Xujiahui, Shanghai in 1882. Later he turned his attentions to mammals.

With his remarkable collection of specimens, he helped to set up a museum of natural history at Xujiahui in 1868, the first of its kind in China. (The museum had been known later as Musée Heude, but was incorporated into other museums since the 1950s.) He continued his scientific works until his death at Xujiahui.

== Bibliography ==
- (in Latin and French) Heude P. M. (1875–1885). Conchyliologie fluviatile de la province de Nanking et de la Chine centrale. Paris. 10 volumes. another scan - this whole work is about freshwater bivalves of China
- (in French) Heude P. M. (1882–1890). "Notes sur les Mollusques terrestres de la vallée du Fleuve Bleu". Mémoires concernant l'histoire naturelle de l'empire chinois par des pères de la Compagnie de Jésus, Mision Catholique, Chang-Hai.
  - (1882). 2: 1-88, plates 12-21.
  - (1885). 3: 89-132, plates 22-32.
  - (1890). 4: 125[sic]-188, plates 33-43.

== See also ==
- List of Jesuit scientists
- List of Roman Catholic scientist-clerics
