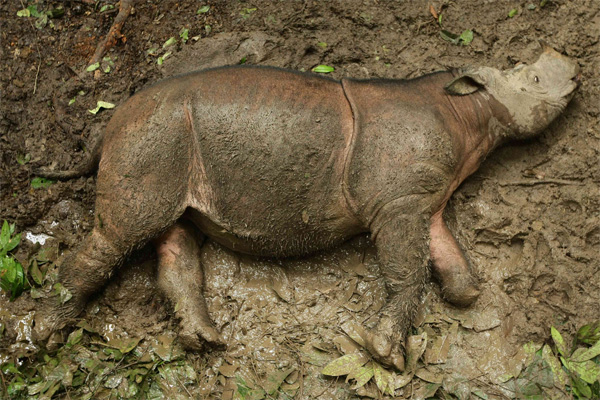
- Bornean rhinoceros in the mud

Conservation status
- Critically Endangered (IUCN 3.1)

Scientific classification
- Kingdom: Animalia
- Phylum: Chordata
- Class: Mammalia
- Order: Perissodactyla
- Family: Rhinocerotidae
- Genus: Dicerorhinus
- Species: D. sumatrensis
- Subspecies: D. s. harrissoni

Trinomial name
- Dicerorhinus sumatrensis harrissoni (Groves, 1965)

= Bornean rhinoceros =

Subspecies of the Sumatran rhinoceros

The Bornean rhinoceros (Dicerorhinus sumatrensis harrissoni), also known as the eastern Sumatran rhinoceros or eastern hairy rhinoceros, is a subspecies of Sumatran rhinoceros that inhabits Borneo. The subspecies was feared to be functionally extinct, with only one individual, a female named Pahu, surviving in captivity, and held in the Malaysian state of Sabah. In April 2015, the Malaysian government declared the Bornean rhinoceros to be extinct in the wild in Malaysia. However, in March 2016, a young female rhino was captured in East Kalimantan (in the Indonesian portion of Borneo), providing evidence of their continued existence. The International Union for Conservation of Nature (IUCN) classifies the subspecies as critically endangered.

== Taxonomy ==
The Bornean rhinoceros is one of three subspecies of the Sumatran rhinoceros. Its scientific name, Dicerorhinus sumatrensis harrissoni, was given in honour of the British polymath Tom Harrisson, who worked extensively with Bornean zoology and anthropology in the 1960s.

== Physical descriptions ==
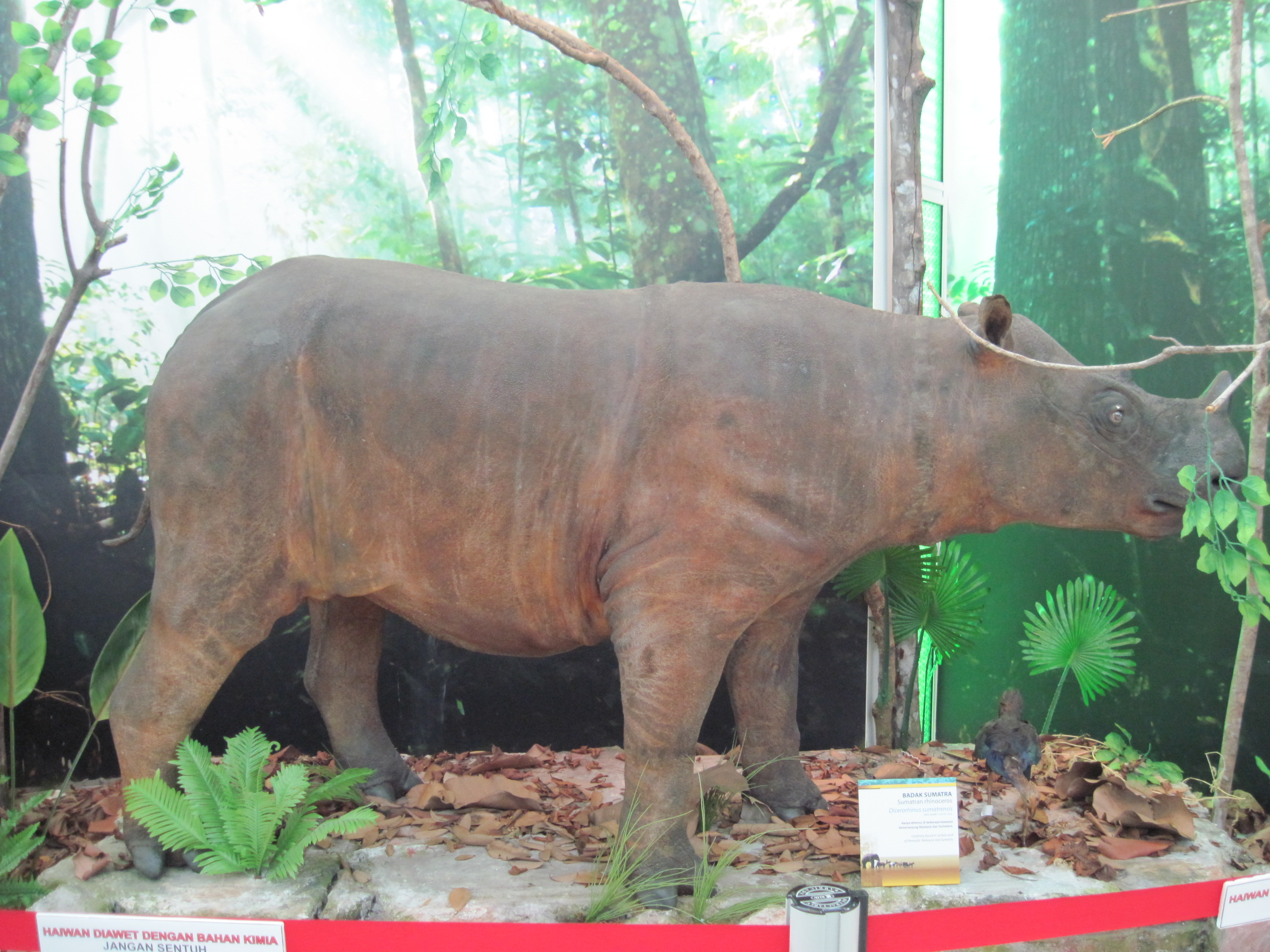
Preserved Bornean rhinoceros

The Bornean rhinoceros is markedly smaller than the other two subspecies, making it the smallest of the extant rhinos. The weight of an adult individual ranges from 600–950 kg (1,320–2,090 lb), the height from 1–1.5 m (3 ft 3 in – 4 ft 11 in), and the body length from 2–3 m (6 ft 7 in – 9 ft 10 in). The Bornean rhinoceros has the darkest skin of the Sumatran rhinos, and the fur of calves is much denser, but it becomes darker and more sparse as the animal matures. The head size is also relatively smaller. The rhinoceros has fringed ears and wrinkles around its eyes. Like the black rhinoceros, it has a prehensile lip. The difference from the Western Sumatran rhinoceros is mainly genetic.

== Habitat and distribution ==
Today, all subspecies of Sumatran rhinoceros, including the Bornean rhinoceros, live in hot, humid closed canopy rainforest. However, as a species which existed during the Pleistocene, it is likely that this was not the habitat in which they evolved.

Bornean rhinos used to inhabit most of Borneo, but their range has been severely reduced. Previously, the sole wild population was thought to be confined to Sabah, mostly in the Tabin Wildlife Reserve. That population is now believed to be extinct. Researchers were surprised to discover another surviving population in East Kalimantan, beginning with video evidence and footprints in 2013 followed by a live specimen found in 2016. Reports of animals surviving in Sarawak are unconfirmed.

== Behavior and ecology ==
The Bornean rhinoceros, like most rhinos, is a solitary animal. It lives in dense rainforest and swamps, usually feeding at dusk and bathing in mud during the day. The animals eat around 50 kg (110 lb) of plant matter per day. Rare minerals are gained from salt licks. These animals are very good swimmers and can maneuver well on steep slopes. They mark their territory with scrapings, bent saplings, and scent marks. The Bornean subspecies may also be more of a browser than most Asian rhinos.

In April 2007, it was announced that a camera trap in Sabah had captured footage of a Bornean rhinoceros eating and investigating the equipment. This was the first footage showing the elusive rhino's natural behavior in the wild.

== Threats and conservation ==
At the start of the 1900s, the Bornean rhinoceros was common throughout its native range. Since then, the population has declined dramatically, and has been reduced to an estimated 15 individuals. It is thought to be extinct in East Malaysia and most of Kalimantan, and now can only be found in East Kalimantan.

This animal is highly threatened by hunting, poaching for their horn, habitat loss, and by having a small, scattered population.

In the 1930s, a huge wave of hunting by natives wiped out much of the rhino's population. The natives killed the rhinos and traded their horns to China. In traditional Chinese culture, rhino horns have special medicinal powers that can heal many ailments. Despite many scientific studies proving this to be false, the market of rhino horns for Chinese medicine has continued, leading to poachers having further decimated the Bornean rhino's population. Using mining and logging roads which cut through already fragmented rainforest, poachers were able to more easily track down rhinos. Poachers continue to be one of the largest threats to the Bornean rhinoceros and local wildlife patrols were increased in November 2015 to protect the remaining population.

Beginning in the 1960s, large-scale logging for international consumption heavily degraded or completely cleared much of Borneo's rainforest. In 2013, it was found that 80% of Malaysian Borneo's forests were heavily impacted by logging. In the 1990s, palm oil became a huge industry in Borneo, having an even larger effect on rhinos and other native species. While animals can still survive in logged forests, palm oil plantations cannot support wildlife and thus completely wiped out the animals previously living in the area.

The widespread habitat destruction and hunting of the Bornean rhinoceros soon led to the population being too fragmented to repopulate. Being extremely elusive and solitary animals, many individuals and populations were separated, making it nearly impossible for the animals to find mates and reproduce. Many of the rhinos captured on camera traps and identified in the wild in the past decade have been largely isolated from other rhinos, and the remaining 15 animals are split up between three isolated populations.

In 2008, it was estimated that there were around 50 rhinos left in the wild in Sabah, with this number dropping to only 10 in 2013. In April 2015, the Bornean rhinoceros was declared to be extinct in Sabah and thought to be completely extinct in the wild.

In 2013, a single rhino was identified in East Kalimantan through footprints and a single image caught by a camera trap. However, this individual was thought to be a lone specimen, and the population was believed to have also gone extinct. Then, in March 2016, experts announced that 15 animals had been identified in the region, with researchers for the World Wildlife Fund (WWF) capturing a live animal in a pit trap in Kutai Barat around the same time. The animal was identified as a female between the age of four and five years old. The discovery proved that the subspecies still existed in the wild and that there were potentially enough animals left to save them. Researchers hope to find at least 10 more animals.

The WWF plans to create a new sanctuary for Bornean rhinos on 200 ha (490 acres) of the 4,561 ha (11,270 acres) Kelian Protected Forest (site of the former Kelian Mine) and move the remaining wild rhinos there to create a larger protected breeding population. The female rhino (named Najaq) was captured in preparation for this, and was moved to a temporary enclosure with plans to airlift her to the protected forest. However, a few days after her capture, Najaq died from an infection on her leg, believed to be caused by a poacher's snare trap.

=== In captivity ===
The Bornean rhinoceros is extremely rare in captivity, with only one individual (female) remaining in captivity at the Borneo Rhinoceros Sanctuary in Sabah. The potential captive breeding of this animals is mostly threatened by the remaining individual being unable to breed. The last male (named Tam) died on May 27, 2019.

In February 2014, a decision was made to send Tam to the Cincinnati Zoo and Botanical Garden to breed with its female Western Sumatran rhinoceros, Suci. The decision to breed the two subspecies together was made in a last-ditch attempt to save the species as a whole and due to the fact that Puntung and Iman are non-reproductive and Suci's only other breeding option in captivity was her brother. The plan later was canceled due to the death of Suci in March 2014 due to Iron Storage Disease. Puntung fell ill and was euthanized in May 2017, so in late 2018 a new female rhinoceros, named Pahu, was captured for the captive breeding program. Tam died from old age in May 2019, leaving Iman and Pahu as the last surviving captive Bornean rhinoceros. However, Iman also died in November 2019, leaving the species locally extinct in Malaysian Borneo and leaving Pahu as the last Bornean rhinoceros in captivity.
