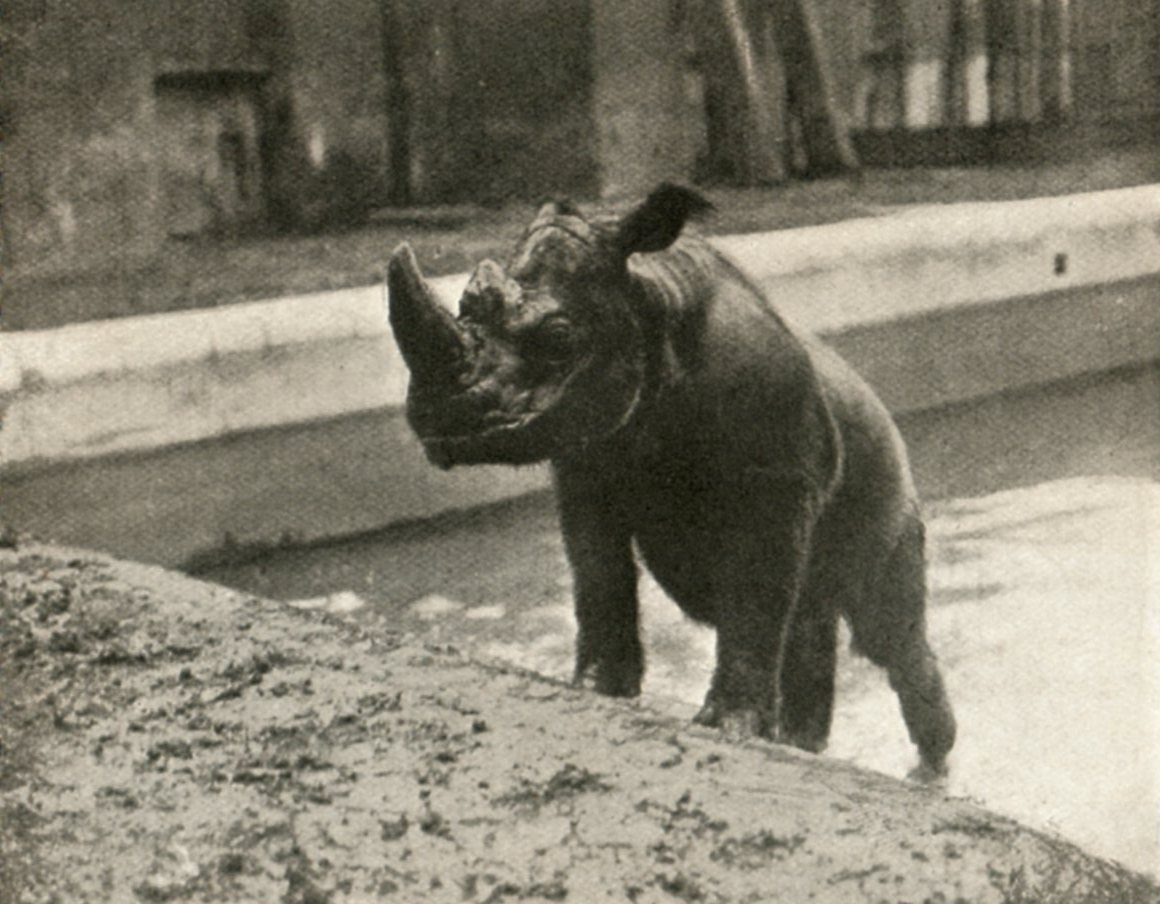
- A northern Sumatran rhinoceros known as "Jackson" at London Zoo, United Kingdom. (photographed between 1903-1905)

Conservation status
- Critically endangered, possibly extinct (IUCN 3.1)

Scientific classification
- Kingdom: Animalia
- Phylum: Chordata
- Class: Mammalia
- Order: Perissodactyla
- Family: Rhinocerotidae
- Genus: Dicerorhinus
- Species: D. sumatrensis
- Subspecies: D. s. lasiotis

Trinomial name
- Dicerorhinus sumatrensis lasiotis (Buckland, 1872)

= Northern Sumatran rhinoceros =

Subspecies of the Sumatran rhino

The northern Sumatran rhinoceros (Dicerorhinus sumatrensis lasiotis), also known as Chittagong rhinoceros or northern hairy rhinoceros, was the most widespread subspecies of Sumatran rhinoceros, as well as the only known subspecies native to mainland Asia.

While it has been officially declared as extinct on multiple occasions in early 20th century, it has been reported that small populations might still exist in the wild, such as in Burma and the Malaysian Peninsula, though it is highly doubtful. As of 2008, it is considered as "Critically Endangered" by IUCN.

== Taxonomy ==
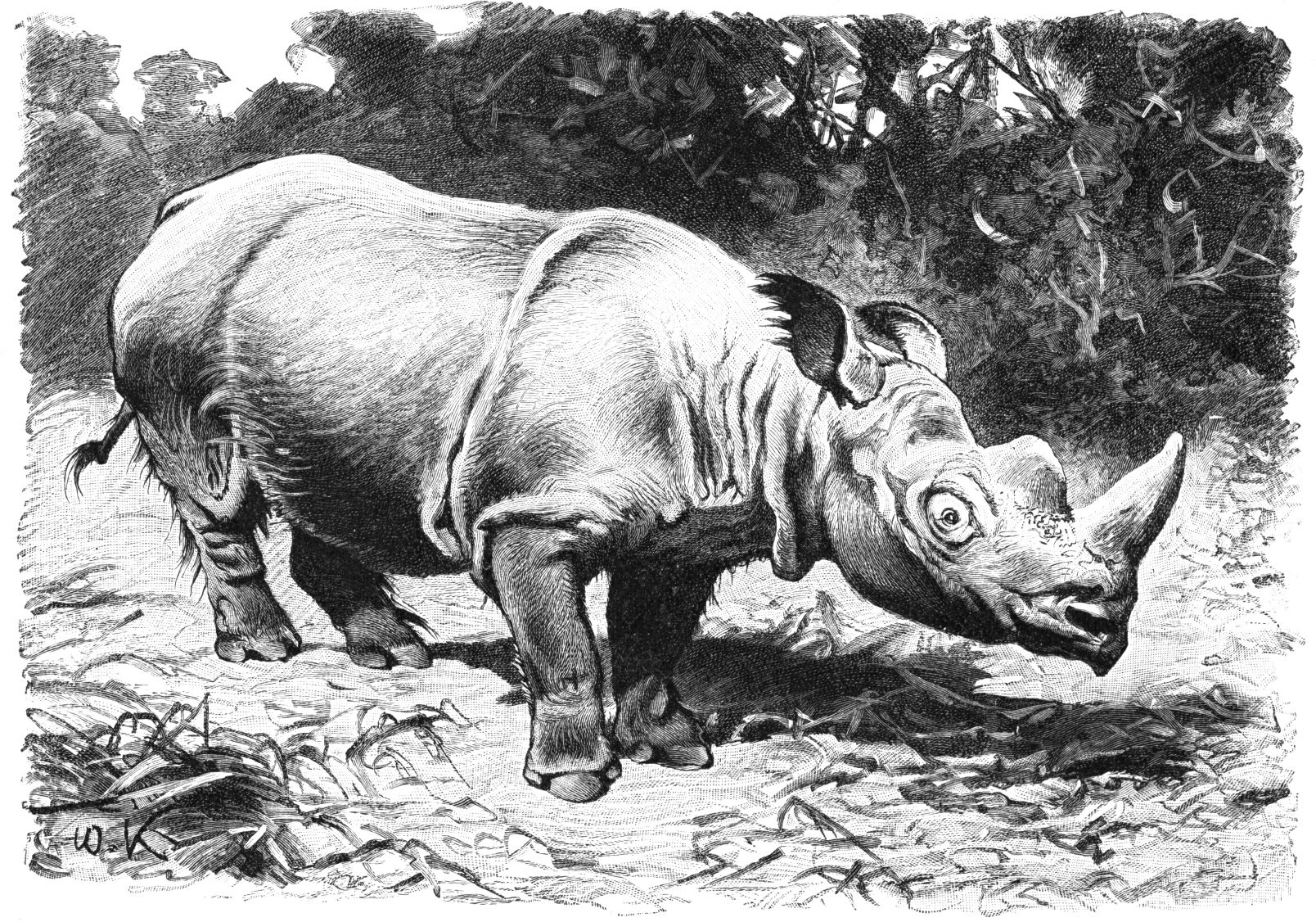
A depiction of the northern Sumatran rhinoceros by Friedrich Wilhelm Kuhnert, 1927

The mainland subspecies of the Sumatran rhinoceros was given the name Dicerorhinus sumatrensis lasiotis. The name lasiotis is derived from the Greek for "hairy-ears", as the northern Sumatran rhinoceros has remarkable longer fur on the ears. The northern Sumatran subspecies was also called hairy-eared Sumatran rhinoceros or ear-fringed rhinoceros for that reason.

There was a debate whether the Dicerorhinus sumatrensis lasiotis specimen should be considered as a separate subspecies from the similar nominate Dicerorhinus sumatrensis sumatrensis specimen from Indonesia. However, it remained a subspecies as the northern Sumatran rhinoceros was significantly larger, with unusual longer hair on the ears, and longer and bigger horns.

== Descriptions ==
The northern Sumatran rhinoceros is the largest subspecies. It has longer hair on the ears and longer horns. However, it may have less hair on the body than the Western Sumatran rhinoceros.

== Habitat and distribution ==
The northern Sumatran rhinoceros lived in tropical rainforests, swamps, cloud forests, jungles and grasslands. It also inhabited hilly areas, near rivers, steep upper valleys and mountains.

The northern Sumatran rhinoceros was the most widespread of the Sumatran rhinoceroses. It ranged as far as from the Indochinese peninsula, eastern India, the eastern Himalayas of Bhutan, and Bangladesh to Inner Mongolia in northern China. The northern hairy rhinoceros was declared extinct in India, Bangladesh, China and other countries in the 1920s, and yet again in 1997 in northeast India, though it is claimed that they persist at the Tamanthi Wildlife Sanctuary of Myanmar. Although the species was declared extinct in Myanmar in the 1980s, sightings of Sumatran rhinoceroses were recently reported on multiple occasions. Unconfirmed reports suggest a small population of northern Sumatran rhinoceros may still survive in Myanmar, but the political situation in the country has prevented verification. It is also possible northern hairy rhinoceros still live in Taman Negara National Park from Peninsular Malaysia, though the survival of the Peninsular Malaysia population is highly doubtful.

== In captivity ==
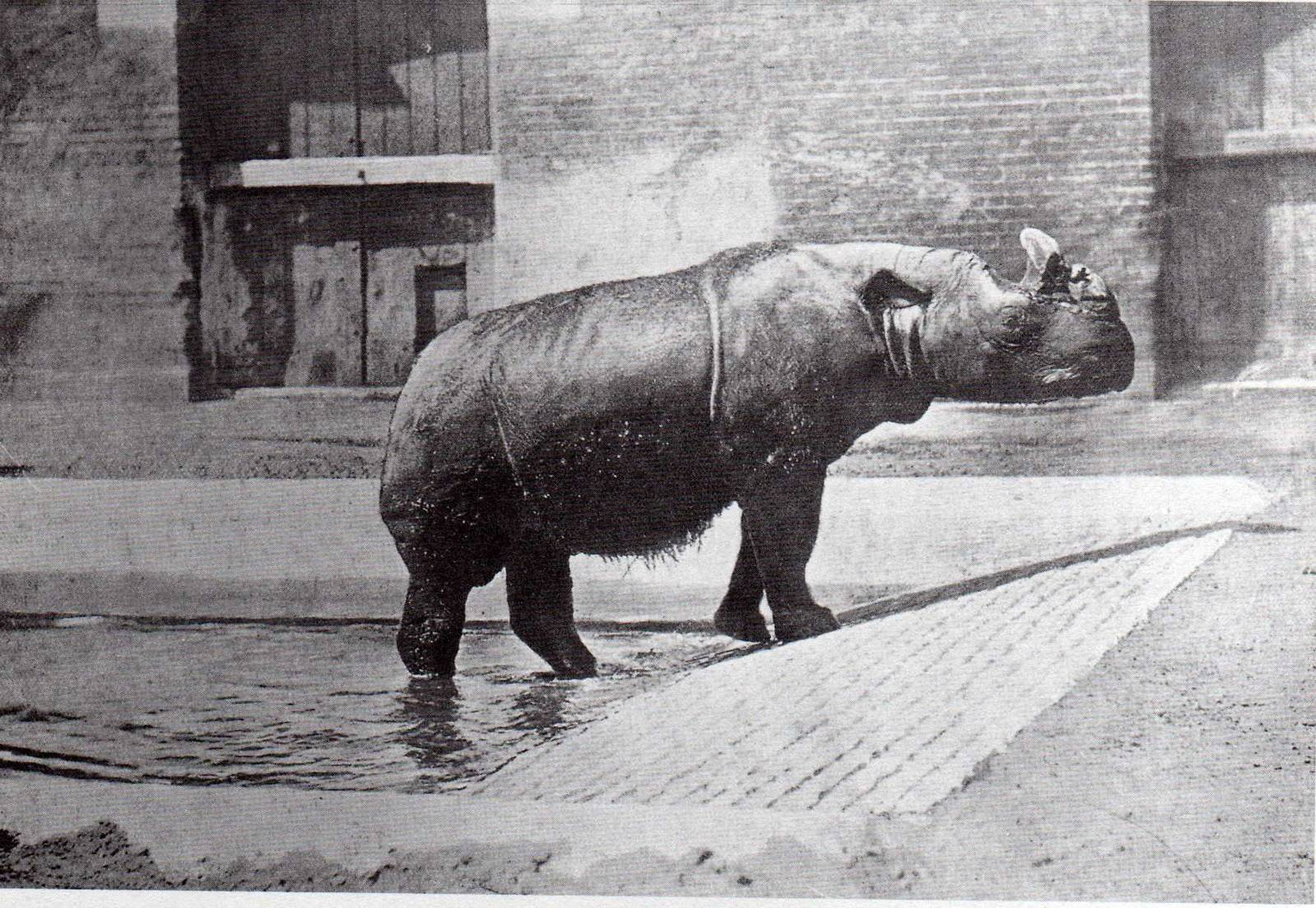
A female northern Sumatran rhinoceros, "Begum", in London Zoo from 15 February 1872 to 31 August 1900.

Northern Sumatran rhinoceroses, like the other two subspecies, do not live outside of their ecosystem and do not breed well in captivity. There has not been a specimen born in a zoo since a single successful birth in the Alipore Zoological Gardens of India in 1889. The London Zoo acquired a male and female in 1872 that had been captured in Chittagong in 1868. The female, named "Begum", survived until 1900, setting the record of lifespan for a captive rhino. Begum was one of at least seven specimens of the extinct subspecies D. s. lasiotis that were held in zoos and circuses.

== Cultural depictions ==
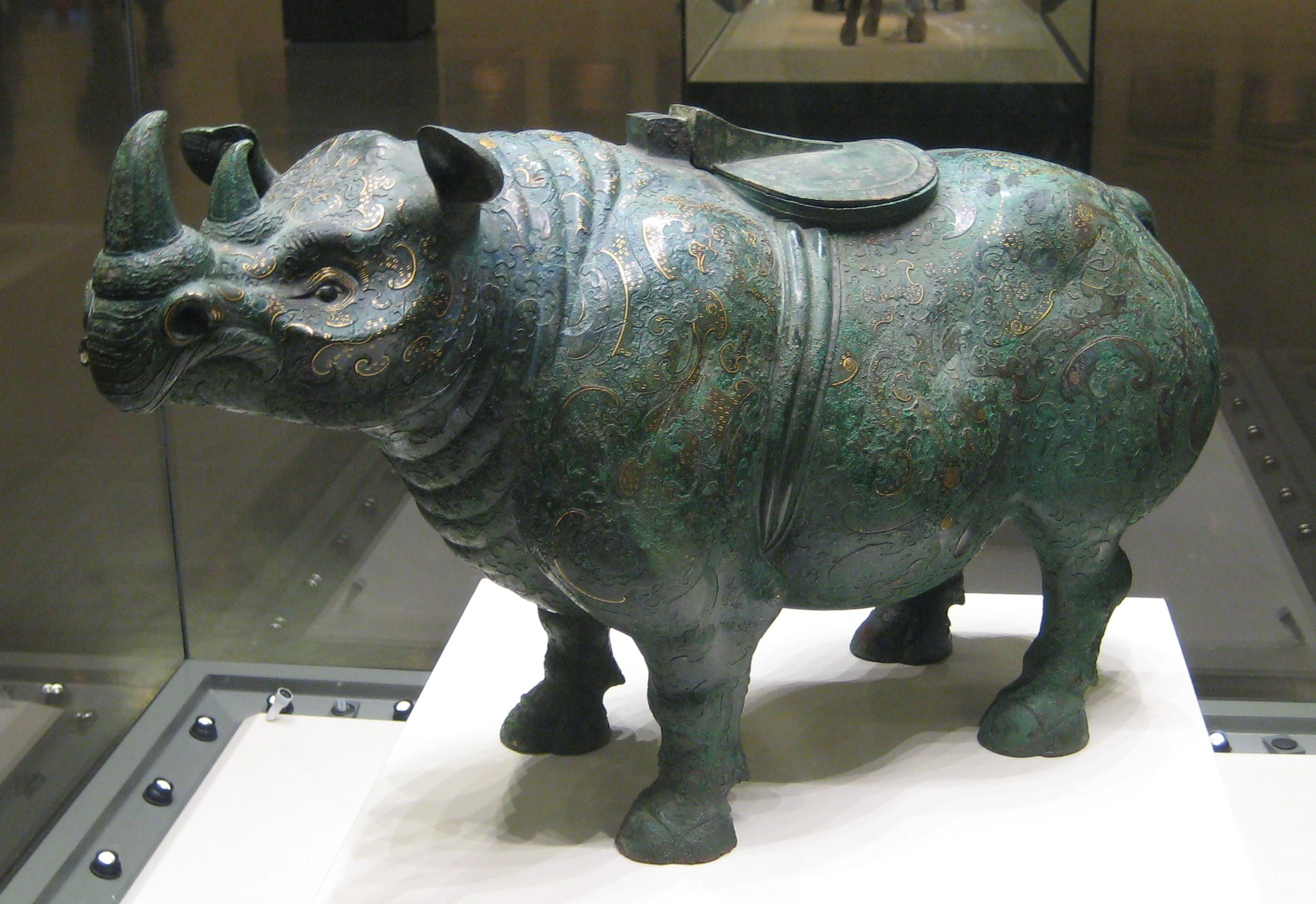
A wine vessel in the form of a bronze two-horned rhinoceros with silver inlay, from the Western Han (202 BC – 9 AD) period of China, sporting a saddle on its back.

The northern Sumatran rhinoceros is known to be the most well respected and depicted in Chinese literature. Most ancient and modern Chinese arts and statues of two-horned rhinoceros represent the northern Sumatran rhinoceros.

A number of folk tales about the Sumatran rhino were collected by colonial naturalists and hunters from the mid-19th century to early 20th century. In Burma, where the Northern subspecies once lived, the belief was once widespread that the Sumatran rhino ate fire. Tales described the fire-eating rhino following smoke to its source, especially campfires, and then attacking the camp. There was also a Burmese belief that the best time to hunt was every July, when the Sumatran rhinos would congregate beneath the full moon.
