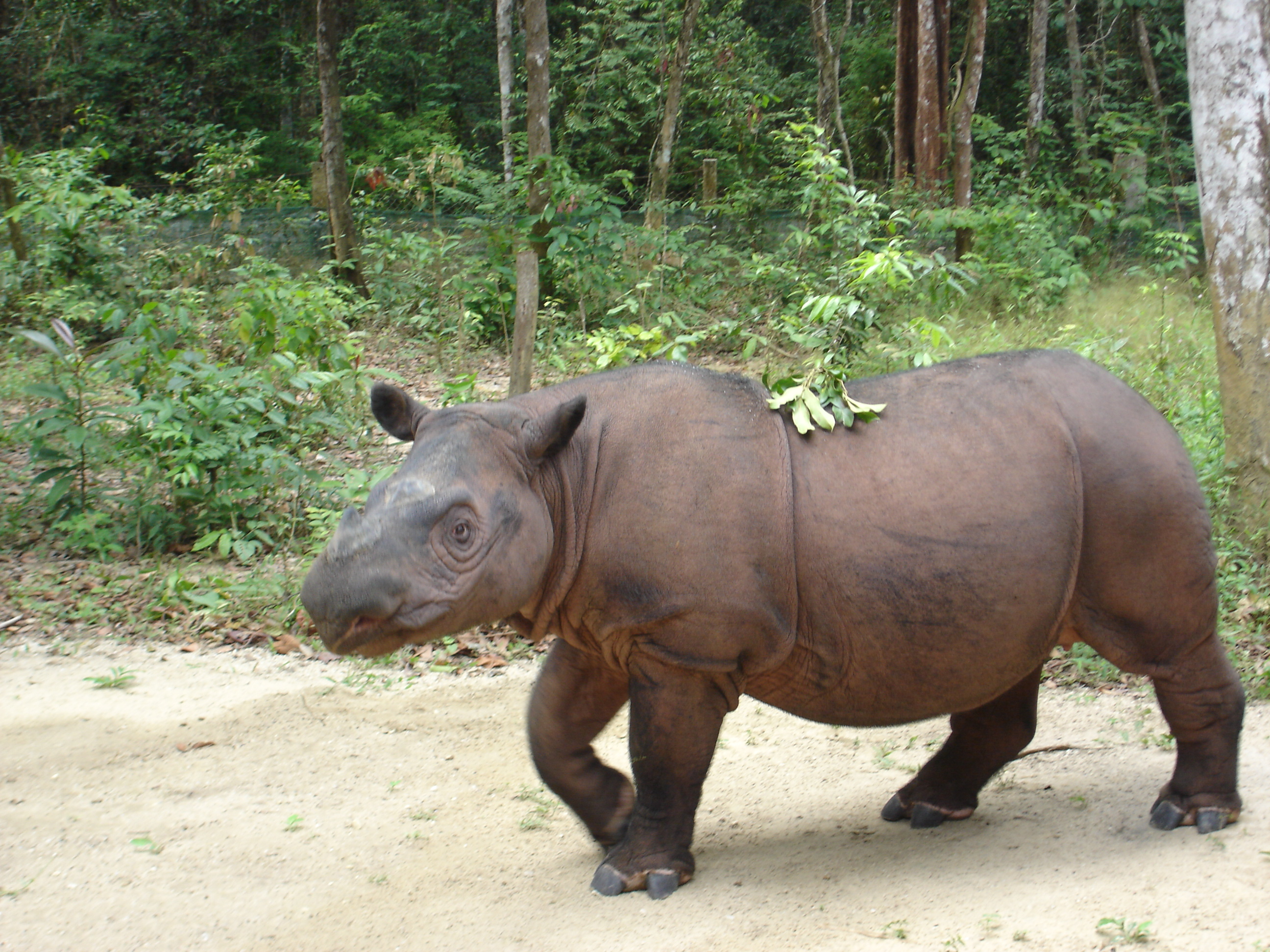
- Sumatran rhinoceros at Sumatran Rhino Sanctuary in Lampung, Indonesia

Conservation status
- Critically Endangered (IUCN 3.1)
- CITES Appendix I

Scientific classification
- Kingdom: Animalia
- Phylum: Chordata
- Class: Mammalia
- Order: Perissodactyla
- Family: Rhinocerotidae
- Genus: Dicerorhinus
- Species: D. sumatrensis

Binomial name
- Dicerorhinus sumatrensis (Fischer, 1814)

Subspecies
- D. s. harrissoni Groves, 1965; D. s. sumatrensis Fischer, 1814; D. s. lasiotis Buckland, 1872
- Sumatran rhinoceros range. This map was created in 2007, based on outdated sources published in 1997 and 2003. The Sumatran rhinoceros has been extinct in Malaysia since 2019.

= Sumatran rhinoceros =

Sumatran rhinoceros Temporal range: Early Pleistocene–Recent

Endangered species of Asian rhinoceros

The Sumatran rhinoceros (Dicerorhinus sumatrensis), also known as the Sumatran rhino, hairy rhinoceros or Asian two-horned rhinoceros, is a rare member of the family Rhinocerotidae and one of five extant species of rhinoceros; it is the only extant species of the genus Dicerorhinus. It is the smallest rhinoceros, although it is still a large mammal; it stands 112–145 cm (44–57 in) high at the shoulder, with a head-and-body length of 2.36–3.18 m (7 ft 9 in – 10 ft 5 in) and a tail of 35–70 cm (14–28 in). The weight is reported to range from 500–1,000 kg (1,100–2,200 lb), averaging 700–800 kg (1,540–1,760 lb). Like both African species, it has two horns; the larger is the nasal horn, typically 15–25 cm (5.9–9.8 in), while the other horn is typically a stub. A coat of reddish-brown hair covers most of the Sumatran rhino's body.

The Sumatran rhinoceros once inhabited rainforests, swamps and cloud forests in India, Bhutan, Bangladesh, Myanmar, Laos, Thailand, Malaysia, Indonesia and southwestern China, particularly in Sichuan. It is now critically endangered, with only five substantial populations in the wild: four in Sumatra and one in Borneo, with an estimated total population of fewer than 80 mature individuals. The species was extirpated in Malaysia in 2019, with the last known bull and cow dying in May and November, respectively, and one of the Sumatran populations may already be extinct. In 2015, researchers announced that the Bornean rhinoceros had become extinct in the northern part of Borneo in Sabah, Malaysia. A tiny population was discovered in East Kalimantan in early 2016.

The Sumatran rhino is a mostly solitary animal except for courtship and offspring-rearing. It is the most vocal rhino species and also communicates through marking soil with its feet, twisting saplings into patterns, and leaving excrement. The species is much better studied than the similarly reclusive Javan rhinoceros, in part because of a program that brought 40 Sumatran rhinos into captivity with the goal of preserving the species. There was little or no information about procedures that would assist in ex situ breeding. Though a number of rhinos died once at the various destinations and no offspring were produced for nearly 20 years, the rhinos were all doomed in their soon-to-be-logged forest.

The Indonesian ministry of Environment began an official count of the Sumatran rhino in February 2019, planned to be completed in three years.

== Taxonomy and naming ==
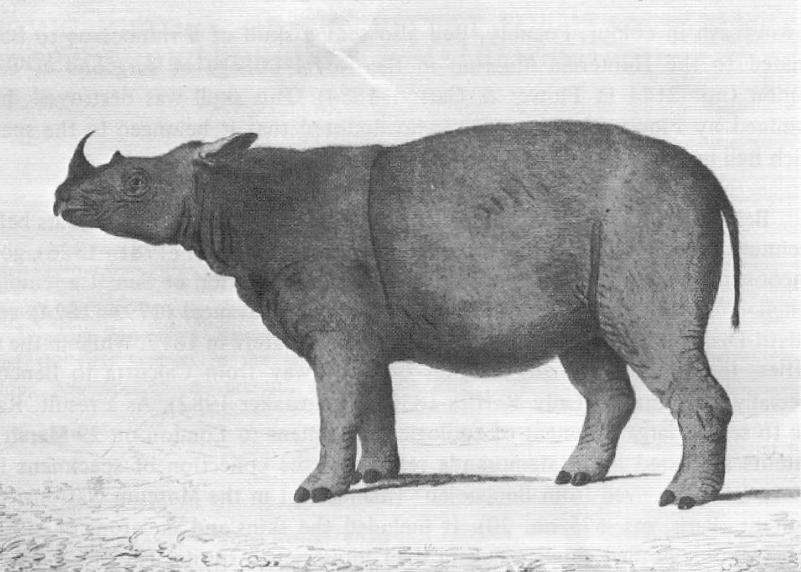
First drawing of the first specimen known to Western science, by William Bell, 1793

The first documented Sumatran rhinoceros was shot 16 km (9.9 mi) outside Fort Marlborough, near the west coast of Sumatra, in 1793. Drawings of the animal, and a written description, were sent to the naturalist Joseph Banks, then president of the Royal Society of London, who published a paper on the specimen that year. In 1814, the species was given a scientific name by Johann Fischer von Waldheim.

The specific epithet sumatrensis signifies "of Sumatra", the Indonesian island where the rhinos were first discovered. Carl Linnaeus originally classified all rhinos in the genus, Rhinoceros; therefore, the species was originally identified as Rhinoceros sumatrensis or sumatranus. Joshua Brookes considered the Sumatran rhinoceros with its two horns a distinct genus from the one-horned Rhinoceros, and gave it the name Didermocerus in 1828. Constantin Wilhelm Lambert Gloger proposed the name Dicerorhinus in 1841. In 1868, John Edward Gray proposed the name Ceratorhinus. Normally, the oldest name would be used, but a 1977 ruling by the International Commission on Zoological Nomenclature established the proper genus name as Dicerorhinus. Dicerorhinus comes from the Greek terms di (δι, meaning "two"), cero (κέρας, meaning "horn"), and rhinos (ρινος, meaning "nose").

The three subspecies are:

D. s. sumatrensis, known as the western Sumatran rhinoceros, which has only 75 to 85 rhinos remaining, mostly in the national parks of Bukit Barisan Selatan and Kerinci Seblat, Gunung Leuser in Sumatra, but also in Way Kambas National Park in small numbers. The subspecies became extinct in Malaysia in 2019. The main threats against this subspecies are habitat loss and poaching. A slight genetic difference is noted between the western Sumatran and Bornean rhinos. The rhinos in Peninsular Malaysia were once known as D. s. niger, but were later recognized to be a synonym of D. s. sumatrensis. Three bulls and five cows currently live in captivity at the Sumatran Rhino Sanctuary at Way Kambas, the youngest bull having been bred and born there in 2012. Another calf, a female, was born at the sanctuary in May 2016. The sanctuary's two bulls were born at the Cincinnati Zoo and Botanical Garden. A third calf female was born in March 2022.

D. s. harrissoni, known as the Bornean rhinoceros or eastern Sumatran rhinoceros, which was once common throughout Borneo; now only about 15 individuals are estimated to survive. The known population lives in East Kalimantan, with them having recently gone extinct in Sabah. Reports of animals surviving in Sarawak are unconfirmed. This subspecies is named after Tom Harrisson, who worked extensively with Bornean zoology and anthropology in the 1960s. The Bornean subspecies is markedly smaller in body size than the other two subspecies. The captive population consisted of one bull and two cows at the Borneo Rhinoceros Sanctuary in Sabah; the bull died in 2019 and the cows died in 2017 and 2019 respectively.

D. s. lasiotis, known as the northern Sumatran rhinoceros or Chittagong rhinoceros, which once roamed India and Bangladesh, has been declared extinct in these countries. Unconfirmed reports suggest a small population may still survive in Myanmar, but the political situation in that country has prevented verification. The name lasiotis is derived from the Greek for "hairy-ears". Later studies showed that their ear hair was not longer than other Sumatran rhinos, but D. s. lasiotis remained a subspecies because it was significantly larger than the other subspecies.

=== Evolution ===
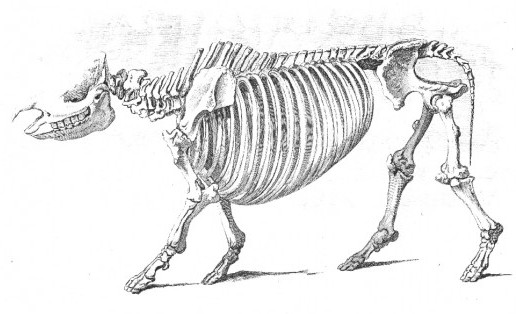
Skeleton of the Sumatran rhinoceros

Ancestral rhinoceroses first diverged from other perissodactyls in the Early Eocene. Mitochondrial DNA comparison suggests the ancestors of modern rhinos split from the ancestors of Equidae around 50 million years ago. The extant family, the Rhinocerotidae, first appeared in the Late Eocene in Eurasia, and the ancestors of the extant rhino species dispersed from Asia beginning in the Miocene.

Although the relationships of modern rhinoceros species to each other were long controversial, modern genetic evidence has placed the Sumatran rhinoceros as more closely related to the Asian one-horned rhinoceroses (the Indian rhinoceros and Javan rhinoceros) belonging to the genus Rhinoceros than to living African rhinoceros species, with the split between Rhinoceros and Dicerorhinus estimated to have occurred around 14.8 million years ago, shortly after the split between the ancestors of Dicerorhinus and Rhinoceros and African rhinoceroses, which is placed around 15.6 million years ago.

Based on morphological and genetic evidence, the Sumatran rhinoceros is believed to be closely related to the extinct woolly rhinoceros (Coelodonta antiquitatis) and Stephanorhinus, with the split between their last common ancestors estimated to be around 9.5 million years ago. The woolly rhinoceros, so named for the coat of hair it shares with the Sumatran rhinoceros, first appeared in China; by the Upper Pleistocene, it ranged across the Eurasian continent from Korea to Spain. The woolly rhinoceros survived until its extinction near the end of the last ice age, around 14,000 years ago. Stephanorhinus species are well known in Europe from the Late Pliocene through the Pleistocene, and China from the Pleistocene, with two species, Stephanorhinus kirchbergensis and the Stephanorhinus hemitoechus surviving into the last glacial period, until at least 40,000 years ago and possibly later.

Although historically many fossil species were assigned to Dicerorhinus today only two fossil species are confidently placed in the genus. These include Dicerorhinus fusuiensis from the Early Pleistocene of South China, and Dicerorhinus gwebinensis from the Pliocene-Early Pleistocene of Myanmar. Fossils of the modern Sumatran rhinoceros are known from the Early Pleistocene onwards.

Pairwise sequential Markovian coalescent (PSMC) analysis of a complete nuclear genome of a Sumatran specimen suggested strong fluctuations in population size, with a general trend of decline over the course of the Middle to Late Pleistocene with an estimated peak effective population size of 57,800 individuals 950,000 years ago, declining to around 500–1,300 individuals at the start of the Holocene, with a slight rebound during the Eemian Interglacial. This was likely due to climate change causing limiting suitable habitat for the Rhinoceros, causing severe population fluctuations as well as population fragmentation due to the flooding of Sundaland. Human induced habitat change and hunting may have played a role in the Late Pleistocene. The study was later criticised for not including DNA from extinct mainland populations, which would have provided a holistic account. A Bayesian skyline plot of complete Mitochondrial genomes from multiple individuals from across the range of the species suggested that the population had been relatively stable with an effective population size of 40,000 individuals over the last 400,000 years, with a sharp decline starting around 25,000 years ago.

Cladogram showing the relationships of recent and Late Pleistocene rhinoceros species (minus Stephanorhinus hemitoechus) based on whole nuclear genomes, after Liu et al, 2021:

- - Elasmotheriinae
    †Elasmotherium sibiricum
  - Rhinocerotinae
    - - Black rhinoceros (Diceros bicornis)
      - White rhinoceros (Ceratotherium simum)
    - - - Indian rhinoceros (Rhinoceros unicornis)
        - Javan rhinoceros (Rhinoceros sondaicus)
      - - Sumatran rhinoceros (Dicerorhinus sumatrensis)
        - - † Woolly rhinoceros (Coelodonta antiquitatis)
          - † Merck's rhinoceros (Stephanorhinus kirchbergensis)

== Description ==
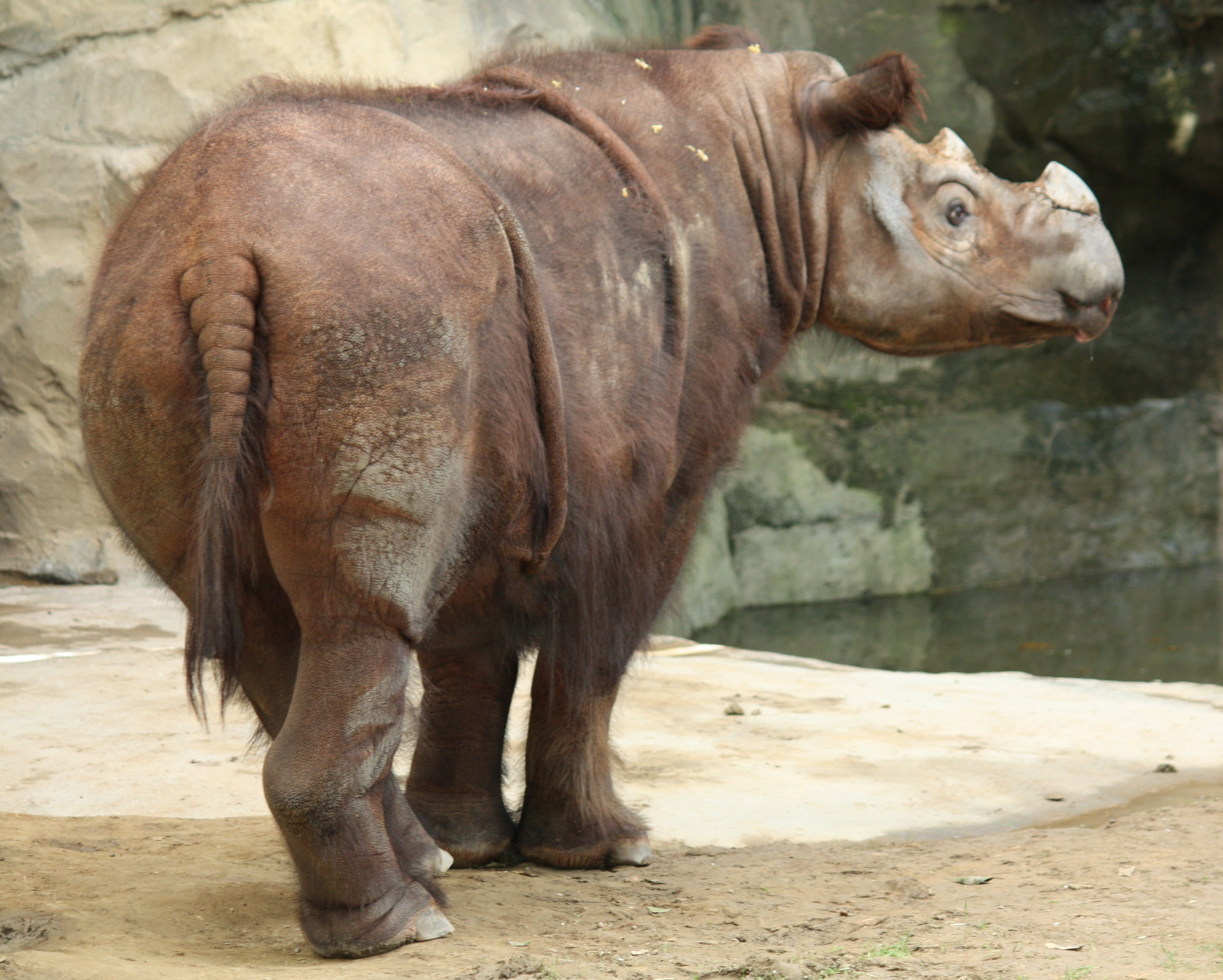
Sumatran rhinoceros at the Cincinnati Zoo in Cincinnati, Ohio

A diagram showing the size of small and large Sumatran rhino individuals compared to humans

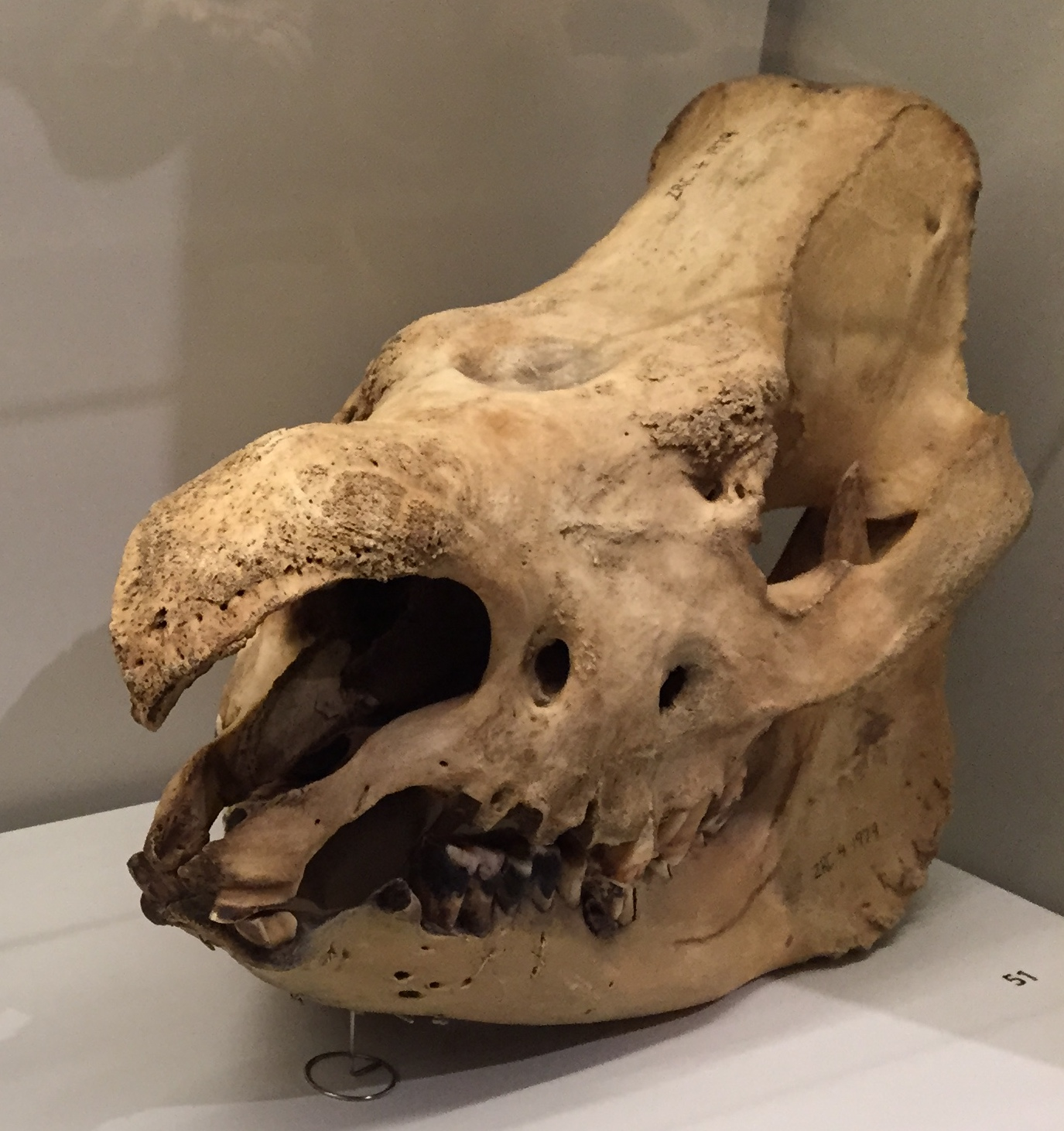
A Sumatran rhinoceros skull

A mature Sumatran rhino stands about 112–145 cm (3.67–4.76 ft) high at the shoulder, has a body length of around 236–318 cm (7.74–10.43 ft), and weighs 500–800 kg (1,100–1,760 lb), though the largest individuals in zoos have been known to weigh as much as 2,000 kg (4,410 lb). Like the two African species, it has two horns. The larger is the nasal horn, typically only 15–25 cm (5.9–9.8 in), though the longest recorded specimen was much longer at 81 cm (32 in). The posterior horn is much smaller, usually less than 10 cm (3.9 in) long, and often little more than a knob. The larger nasal horn is also known as the anterior horn; the smaller posterior horn is known as the frontal horn. The horns are dark grey or black in color. The bulls have larger horns than the cows, though the species is not otherwise sexually dimorphic. The Sumatran rhino lives an estimated 30–45 years in the wild, while the record time in captivity is a female D. lasiotis, which lived for 32 years and 8 months before dying in the London Zoo in 1900.

Two thick folds of skin encircle the body behind the front legs and before the hind legs. The rhino has a smaller fold of skin around its neck. The skin itself is thin, 10–16 mm (0.39–0.63 in), and in the wild, the rhino appears to have no subcutaneous fat. Hair can range from dense (the most dense hair in young calves) to scarce, and is usually a reddish brown. In the wild, this hair is hard to observe because the rhinos are often covered in mud. In captivity, however, the hair grows out and becomes much shaggier, likely because of less abrasion from walking through vegetation. The rhino has a patch of long hair around its ears and a thick clump of hair at the end of its tail. Like all rhinos, they have very poor vision. The Sumatran rhinoceros is fast and agile; it climbs mountains easily and comfortably traverses steep slopes and riverbanks.

== Distribution and habitat ==
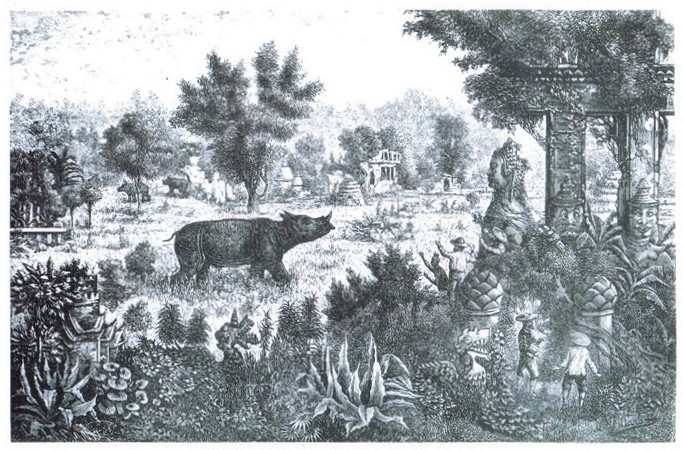
A rhinoceros roaming the ruined city of Chiang Saen, northern Thailand, in 1867

Remains of Sumatran rhinoceros have been found in Chinese Neolithic sites of Zhejiang, Henan, Fujian, and the northeastern Tibetan Plateau. A revision of Rhinoceros sinensis fossils from Chongqing also identified previously misdiagnosed Sumatran rhinoceros remains among them, proving that the species was already present in Southern China during the Pleistocene. The Sumatran rhinoceros was the most common species in ancient and medieval China, where it coexisted with the rarer Javan rhinoceros.

In Southeast Asia, the Sumatran rhinoceros lives in both lowland and highland secondary rainforest, swamps, and cloud forests. It inhabits hilly areas close to water, particularly steep upper valleys with copious undergrowth. The Sumatran rhinoceros once inhabited a continuous range as far north as Myanmar, eastern India, and Bangladesh. Unconfirmed reports also placed it in Cambodia, Laos, and Vietnam. All known living animals occur in the island of Sumatra. Some conservationists hope Sumatran rhinos may still survive in Burma, though it is considered unlikely. Political turmoil in Burma has prevented any assessment or study of possible survivors. The last reports of stray animals from Indian limits were in the 1990s.

The Sumatran rhino is widely scattered across its range, much more so than the other Asian rhinos, which has made it difficult for conservationists to protect members of the species effectively. Only four areas are known to contain Sumatran rhinoceros: Bukit Barisan Selatan National Park, Gunung Leuser National Park, and Way Kambas National Park on Sumatra; and on Indonesian Borneo west of Samarindah.

The Kerinci Seblat National Park, Sumatra's largest, was estimated to contain a population of around 500 rhinos in the 1980s, but due to poaching, this population is now considered extinct. The survival of any animals in Peninsular Malaysia is extremely unlikely.

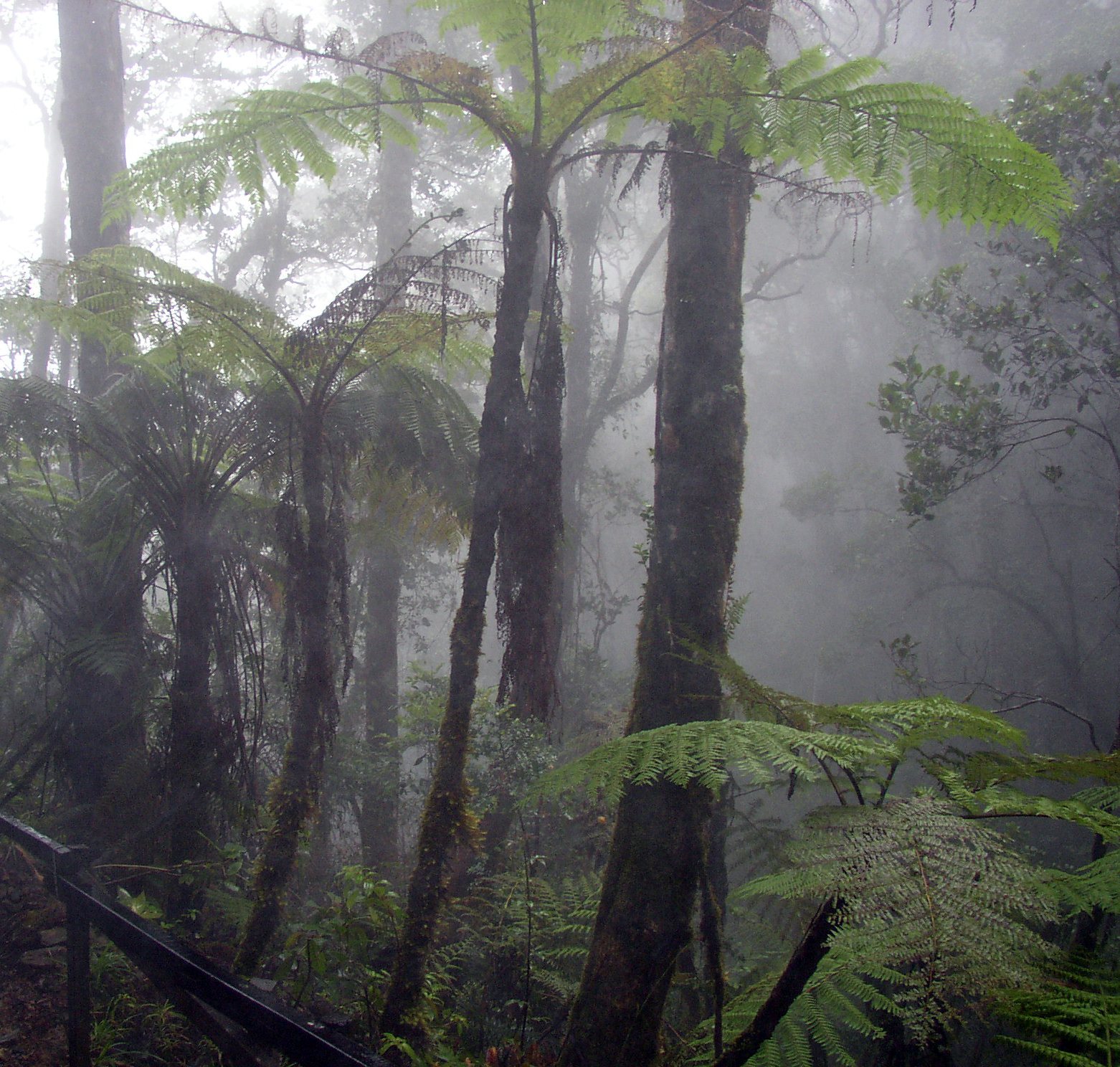
A cloud forest in Sabah, Borneo

Genetic analysis of Sumatran rhino populations has identified three distinct genetic lineages. The channel between Sumatra and Malaysia was not as significant a barrier for the rhinos as the Barisan Mountains along the length of Sumatra, for rhinos in eastern Sumatra and Peninsular Malaysia are more closely related than the rhinos on the other side of the mountains in western Sumatra. In fact, the eastern Sumatra and Malaysia rhinos show so little genetic variance, the populations were likely not separate during the Pleistocene, when sea levels were much lower and Sumatra formed part of the mainland. Both populations of Sumatra and Malaysia, however, are close enough genetically that interbreeding would not be problematic. The rhinos of Borneo are sufficiently distinct that conservation geneticists have advised against crossing their lineages with the other populations. Conservation geneticists have recently begun to study the diversity of the gene pool within these populations by identifying microsatellite loci. The results of initial testing found levels of variability within Sumatran rhino populations comparable to those in the population of the less endangered African rhinos, but the genetic diversity of Sumatran rhinos is an area of continuing study.

Although the rhino had been thought to be extinct in Kalimantan since the 1990s, in March 2013 World Wildlife Fund (WWF) announced that the team when monitoring orangutan activity found in West Kutai Regency, East Kalimantan, several fresh rhino foot trails, mud holes, traces of rhino-rubbed trees, traces of rhino horns on the walls of mud holes, and rhino bites on small branches. The team also identified that rhinos ate more than 30 species of plants. On 2 October 2013, video images made with camera traps showing the Sumatran rhino in Kutai Barat, Kalimantan, were released by the World Wildlife Fund. Experts assume the videos show two different animals, but are not certain. According to the Indonesia's Minister of Forestry, Zulkifli Hasan called the video evidence "very important" and mentioned Indonesia's "target of rhino population growth by three percent per year". On 22 March 2016 it was announced by the WWF that a live Sumatran rhino was found in Kalimantan; it was the first contact in over 40 years. The rhino, a female, was captured and transported to a nearby sanctuary to ensure her survival.

Iman, the last known Sumatran rhino in Malaysia, died in November 2019; stem cell technology is being used in an attempt to revitalize the rhino's population and reverse extinction in the country. As of 2023, there has been two births at the Sumatran Rhino Sanctuary at Way Kambas National Park, Indonesia.

== Behavior and ecology ==
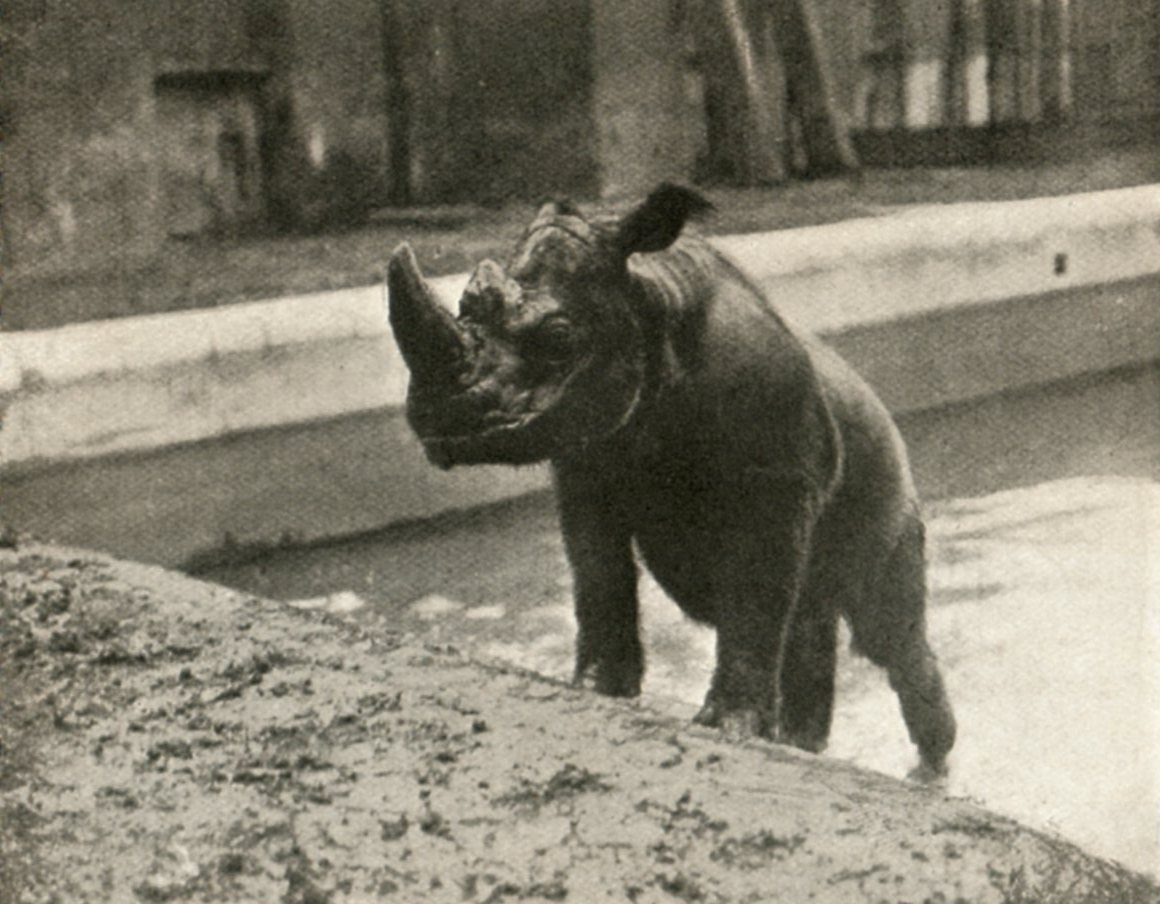
Male of the possibly extinct D. s. lasiotis with a large front horn in London Zoo around 1904

Sumatran rhinos are solitary creatures except for pairing before mating and during offspring rearing. Individuals have home ranges; bulls have territories as large as 50 km^{2} (19 mi^{2}), whereas cows' ranges are 10–15 km^{2} (3.9–5.8 mi^{2}). The ranges of cows appear to be spaced apart; bulls' ranges often overlap. No evidence indicates Sumatran rhinos defend their territories through fighting. Marking their territories is done by scraping soil with their feet, bending saplings into distinctive patterns, and leaving excrement. The Sumatran rhino is usually most active when eating, at dawn, and just after dusk. During the day, they wallow in mud baths to cool down and rest. In the rainy season, they move to higher elevations; in the cooler months, they return to lower areas in their range. When mud holes are unavailable, the rhino will deepen puddles with its feet and horns. The wallowing behaviour helps the rhino maintain its body temperature and protect its skin from ectoparasites and other insects. Captive specimens, deprived of adequate wallowing, have quickly developed broken and inflamed skins, suppurations, eye problems, inflamed nails, and hair loss, and have eventually died. One 20-month study of wallowing behavior found they will visit no more than three wallows at any given time. After two to 12 weeks using a particular wallow, the rhino will abandon it. Typically, the rhino will wallow around midday for two to three hours at a time before venturing out for food. Although in zoos the Sumatran rhino has been observed wallowing less than 45 minutes a day, the study of wild animals found 80–300 minutes (an average of 166 minutes) per day spent in wallows.

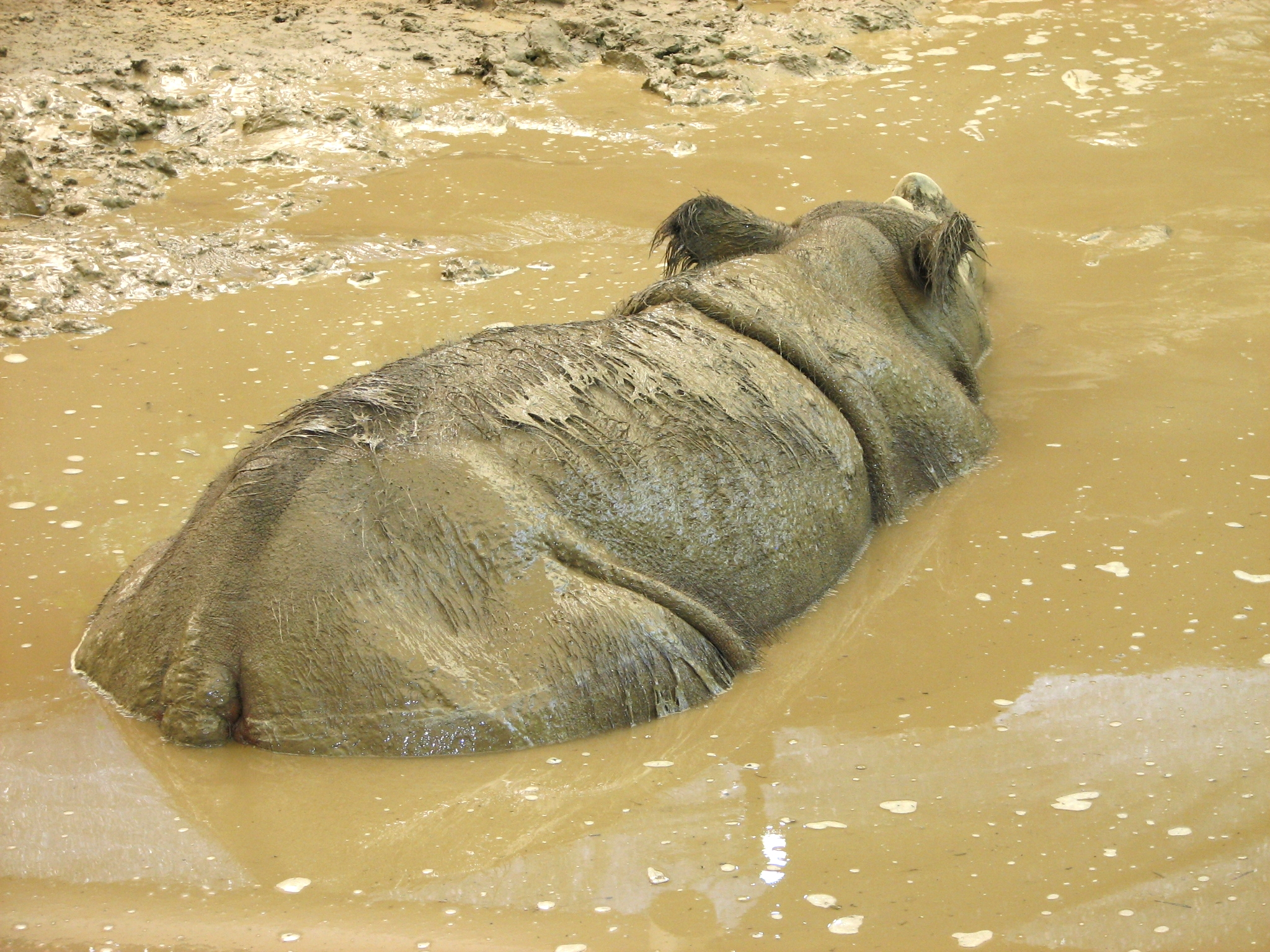
Sumatran rhinoceros wallowing, Cincinnati Zoo

There has been little opportunity to study epidemiology in the Sumatran rhinoceros. Ticks and gyrostigma were reported to cause deaths in captive animals in the 19th century. The rhino is also known to be vulnerable to the blood disease surra, which can be spread by horse-flies carrying parasitic trypanosomes; in 2004, all five rhinos at the Sumatran Rhinoceros Conservation Center died over an 18-day period after becoming infected by the disease. The Sumatran rhino has no known predators other than humans. Tigers and wild dogs may be capable of killing a calf, but calves stay close to their mothers, and the frequency of such killings is unknown. Although the rhino's range overlaps with elephants and tapirs, the species do not appear to compete for food or habitat. Asian elephants (Elephas maximus) and Sumatran rhinos are even known to share trails, and many smaller species, such as deer, boars, and wild dogs, will use the trails the rhinos and elephants create.

The Sumatran rhino maintains two types of trails across its range. Main trails will be used by generations of rhinos to travel between important areas in the rhino's range, such as between salt licks, or in corridors through inhospitable terrain that separates ranges. In feeding areas, the rhinos will make smaller trails, still covered by vegetation, to areas containing food the rhino eats. Sumatran rhino trails have been found that cross rivers deeper than 1.5 m (4.9 ft) and about 50 m (160 ft) across. The currents of these rivers are known to be strong, but the rhino is a strong swimmer. A relative absence of wallows near rivers in the range of the Sumatran rhinoceros indicates they may occasionally bathe in rivers in lieu of wallowing.

=== Diet ===
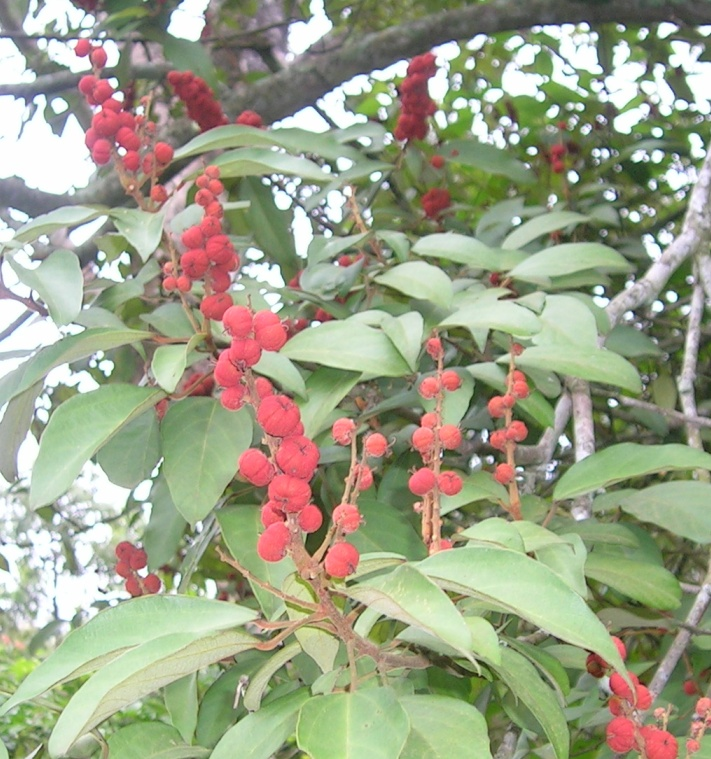
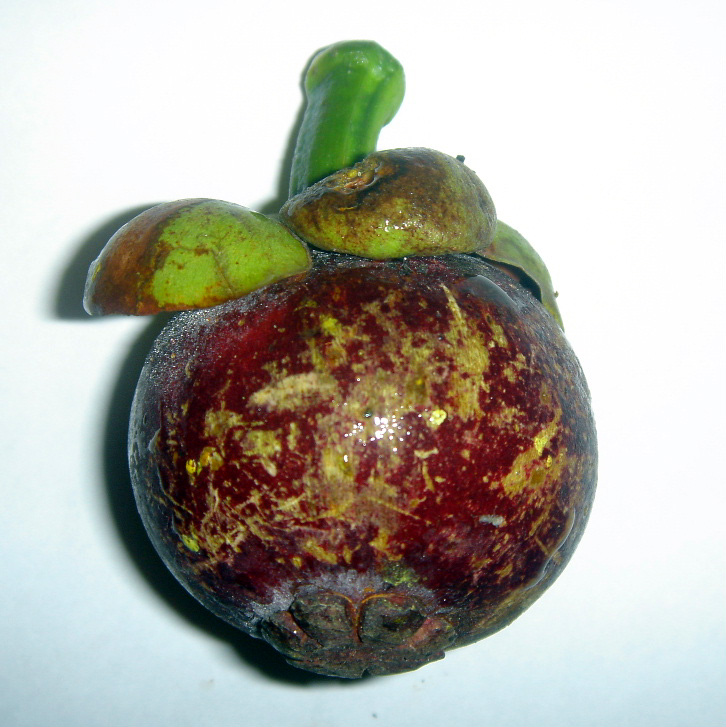
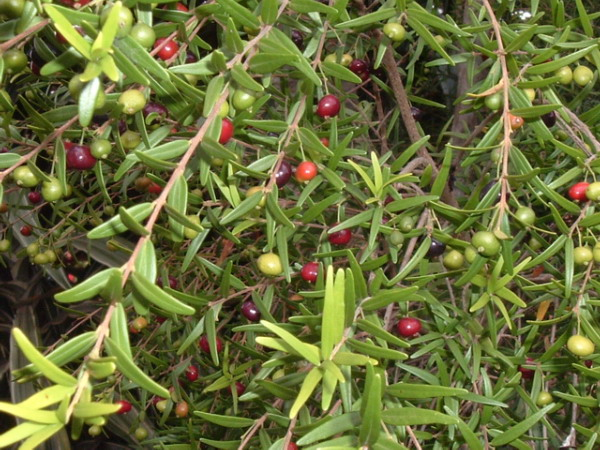
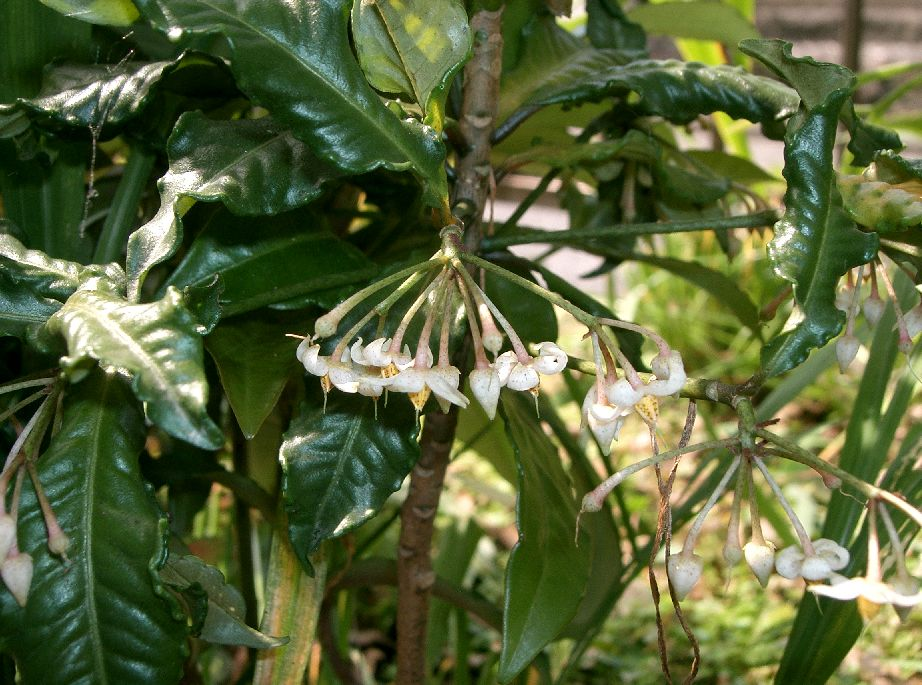
Clockwise from top left: Mallotus, mangosteens, Ardisia, and Eugenia

Most feeding occurs just before nightfall and in the morning. The Sumatran rhino is a folivore, with a diet of young saplings, leaves, twigs, and shoots. The rhinos usually consume up to 50 kg (110 lb) of food a day. Primarily by measuring dung samples, researchers have identified more than 100 food species consumed by the Sumatran rhinoceros. The largest portion of the diet is tree saplings with a trunk diameter of 1–6 cm (0.39–2.36 in). The rhinoceros typically pushes these saplings over with its body, walking over the sapling without stepping on it, to eat the leaves. Many of the plant species the rhino consumes exist in only small portions, which indicates the rhino is frequently changing its diet and feeding in different locations. Among the most common plants the rhino eats are many species from the Euphorbiaceae, Rubiaceae, and Melastomataceae families. The most common species the rhino consumes is Eugenia.

The vegetal diet of the Sumatran rhinoceros is high in fiber and only moderate in protein. Salt licks are very important to the nutrition of the rhino. These licks can be small hot springs, seepages of salty water, or mud-volcanoes. The salt licks also serve an important social purpose for the rhinos—bulls visit the licks to pick up the scent of cows in oestrus. Some Sumatran rhinos, however, live in areas where salt licks are not readily available, or the rhinos have not been observed using the licks. These rhinos may get their necessary mineral requirements by consuming plants rich in minerals.

=== Communication ===
The Sumatran rhinoceros is the most vocal of the rhinoceros species. Observations of the species in zoos show the animal almost constantly vocalizing, and it is known to do so in the wild, as well. The rhino makes three distinct noises: eeps, whales, and whistle-blows. The eep, a short, one-second-long yelp, is the most common sound. The whale, named for its similarity to vocalizations of the humpback whale, is the most song-like vocalization and the second-most common. The whale varies in pitch and lasts from four to seven seconds. The whistle-blow is named because it consists of a two-second-long whistling noise and a burst of air in immediate succession. The whistle-blow is the loudest of the vocalizations, loud enough to make the iron bars in the zoo enclosure where the rhinos were studied vibrate. The purpose of the vocalizations is unknown, though they are theorized to convey danger, sexual readiness, and location, as do other ungulate vocalizations. The whistle-blow could be heard at a great distance, even in the dense brush in which the Sumatran rhino lives. A vocalization of similar volume from elephants has been shown to carry 9.8 km (6.1 mi) and the whistle-blow may carry as far. The Sumatran rhinoceros will sometimes twist the saplings they do not eat. This twisting behavior is believed to be used as a form of communication, frequently indicating a junction in a trail.

=== Reproduction ===
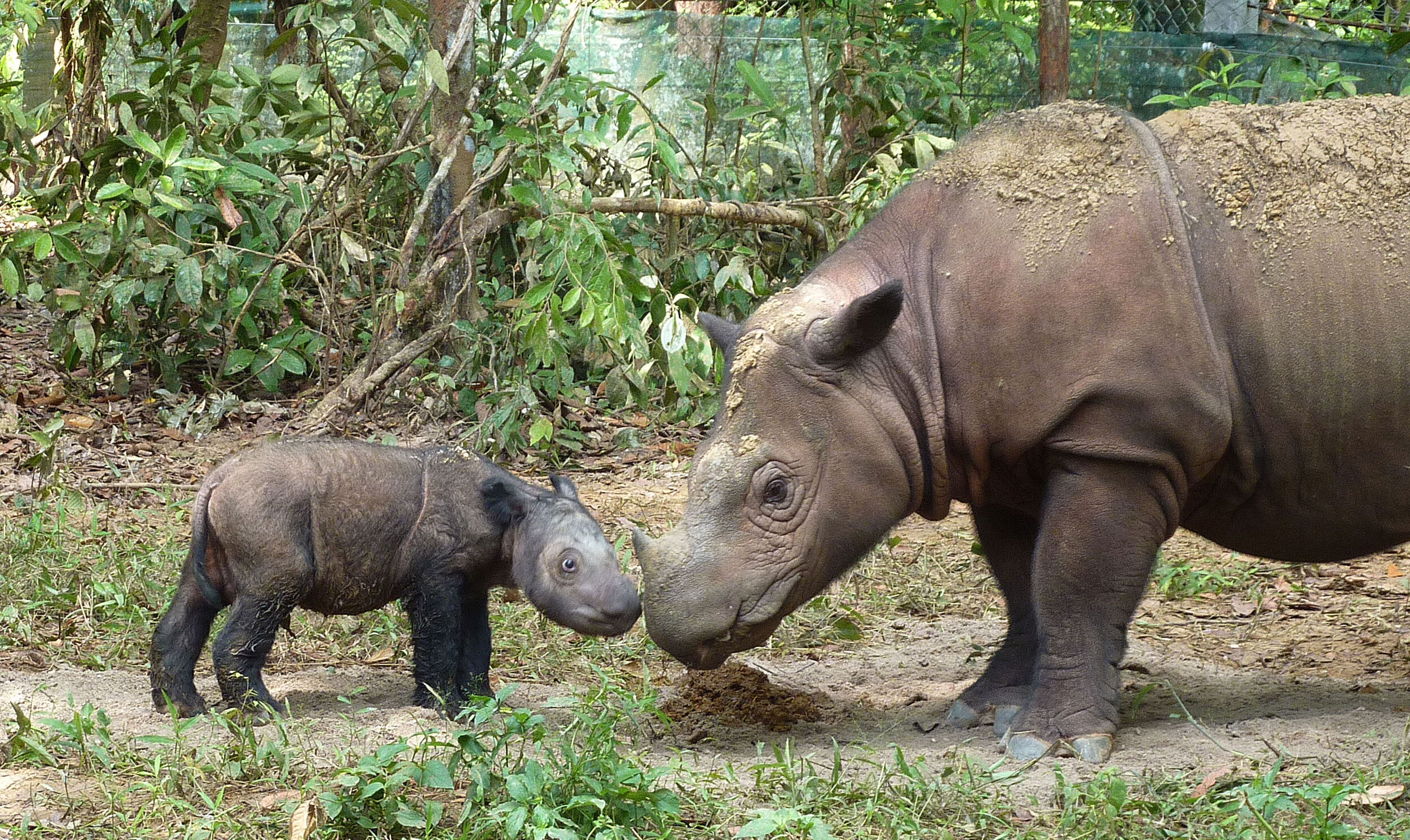
Mother with four-day-old juvenile

Cows become sexually mature at the age of six to seven years, while bulls become sexually mature at about 10 years old. The gestation period is around 15–16 months. The calf, which typically weighs 40–60 kg (88–132 lb), is weaned after about 15 months and stays with its mother for the first two to three years of its life. In the wild, the birth interval for this species is estimated to be four to five years; its natural offspring-rearing behavior is unstudied.

The reproductive habits of the Sumatran rhinoceros have been studied in captivity. Sex relationships begin with a courtship period characterized by increased vocalization, tail raising, urination, and increased physical contact, with both bull and cow using their snouts to bump the other in the head and genitals. The pattern of courtship is most similar to that of the black rhinoceros. Young Sumatran rhino bulls are often too aggressive with cows, sometimes injuring and even killing them during the courtship. In the wild, the cow could run away from an overly aggressive bull, but in their smaller captive enclosures, they cannot; this inability to escape aggressive bulls may partly contribute to the low success rate of captive-breeding programs.

The period of oestrus itself, when the cow is receptive to the bull, lasts about 24 hours, and observations have placed its recurrence between 21 and 25 days. Sumatran rhinos in the Cincinnati Zoo have been observed copulating for 30–50 minutes, similar in length to other rhinos; observations at the Sumatran Rhinoceros Conservation Centre in Malaysia have shown a briefer copulation cycle. As the Cincinnati Zoo has had successful pregnancies, and other rhinos also have lengthy copulatory periods, a lengthy rut may be the natural behavior. Though researchers observed successful conceptions, all these pregnancies ended in failure for a variety of reasons until the first successful captive birth in 2001; studies of these failures at the Cincinnati Zoo discovered the Sumatran rhino's ovulation is induced by mating and it had unpredictable progesterone levels. Breeding success was finally achieved in 2001, 2004, and 2007 by providing a pregnant rhino with supplementary progestin. In 2016, a calf was born in captivity in western Indonesia, only the fifth such birth in a breeding facility. In March 2022, and 1 October 2023, female calves were born at the Sumatran Rhino Sanctuary (SRS), as well as a male calf born on 25 November 2023. Way Kambas National Park, Lampung province, Indonesia.

== Population trends ==
Year	Estimated Population	Source
2015	< 80	IUCN
2020	< 50	WWF

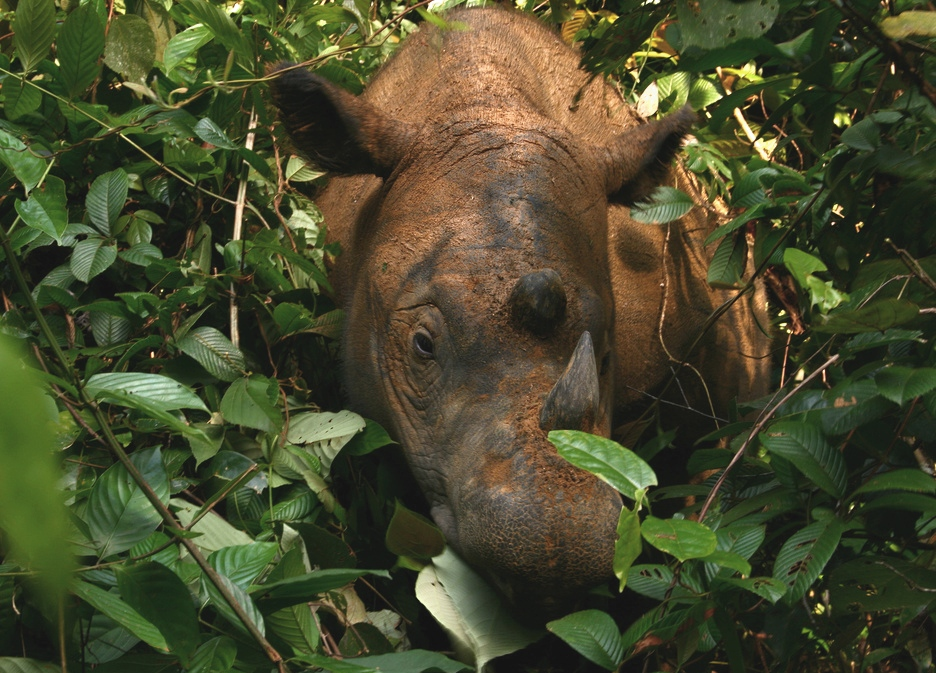
D. s. sumatrensis, Sumatran Rhino Sanctuary

=== In the wild ===
Sumatran rhinos were once quite numerous throughout Southeast Asia. Fewer than 100 individuals are now estimated to remain. The species is classed as critically endangered (primarily due to illegal poaching) while the last survey in 2008 estimated that around 250 individuals survived. From the early 1990s, the population decline was estimated at more than 50% per decade, and the small, scattered populations now face high risks of inbreeding depression. Most remaining habitat is in relatively inaccessible mountainous areas of Indonesia.

Poaching of Sumatran rhinos is a cause for concern, due to the high market price of its horns. This species has been overhunted for many centuries, leading to the current greatly reduced and still declining population. The rhinos are difficult to observe and hunt directly (one field researcher spent seven weeks in a treehide near a salt lick without ever observing a rhino directly), so poachers make use of spear traps and pit traps. In the 1970s, uses of the rhinoceros's body parts among the local people of Sumatra were documented, such as the use of rhino horns in amulets and a folk belief that the horns offer some protection against poison. Dried rhinoceros meat was used as medicine for diarrhea, leprosy, and tuberculosis. "Rhino oil", a concoction made from leaving a rhino's skull in coconut oil for several weeks, may be used to treat skin diseases. The extent of use and belief in these practices is not known. Rhinoceros horn was once believed to be widely used as an aphrodisiac; in fact traditional Chinese medicine never used it for this purpose. Nevertheless, hunting in this species has primarily been driven by a demand for rhino horns with unproven medicinal properties.

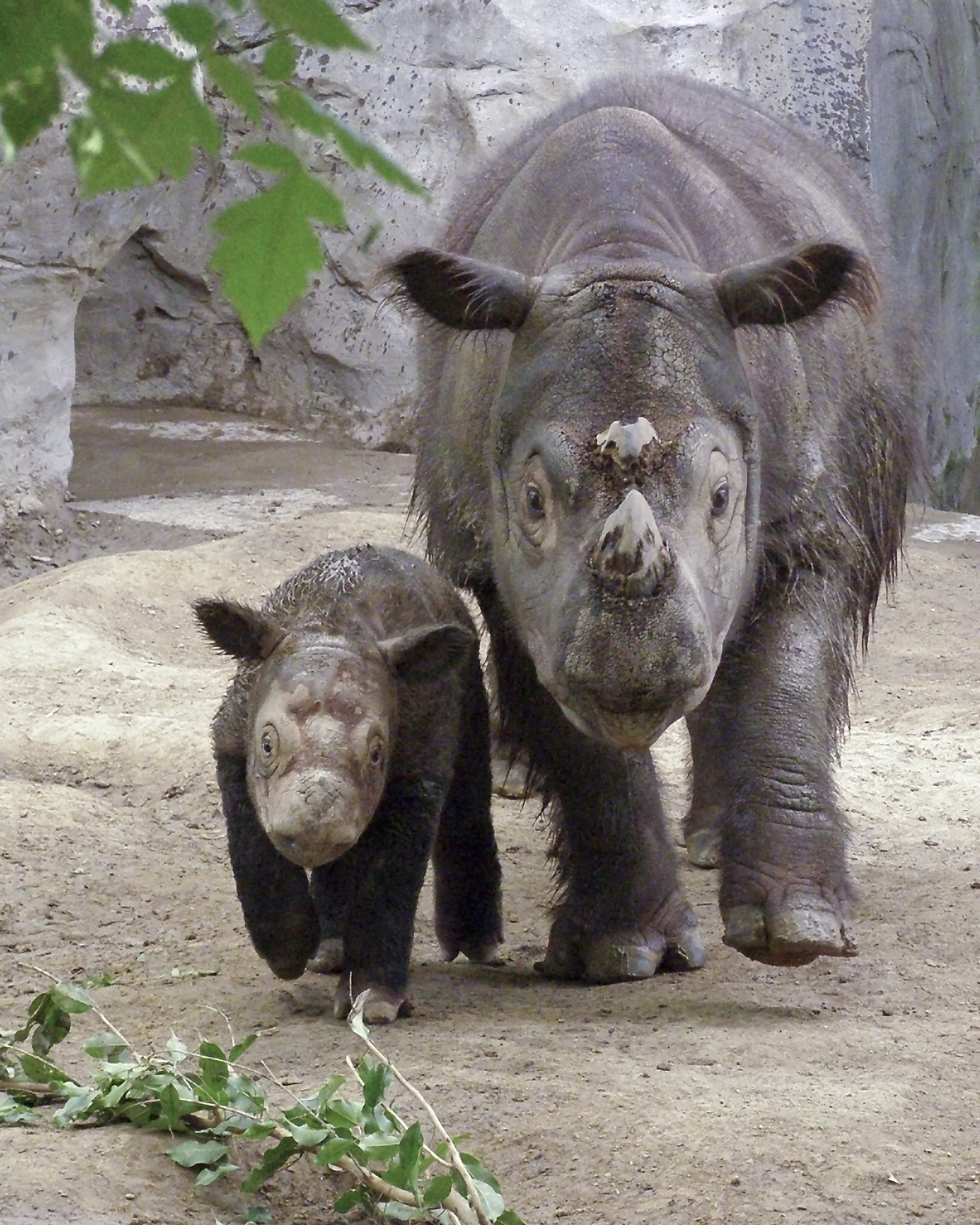
Adult with juvenile, Cincinnati Zoo

The rainforests of Indonesia and Malaysia, which the Sumatran rhino inhabits, are also targets for legal and illegal logging because of the desirability of their hardwoods. Rare woods such as merbau, meranti and semaram are valuable on the international markets, fetching as much as $1,800 per m^{3} ($1,375 per cu yd). Enforcement of illegal-logging laws is difficult because humans live within or near many of the same forests as the rhino. The 2004 Indian Ocean earthquake has been used to justify new logging. Although the hardwoods in the rainforests of the Sumatran rhino are destined for international markets and not widely used in domestic construction, the number of logging permits for these woods has increased dramatically because of the tsunami. However, while this species has been suggested to be highly sensitive to habitat disturbance, apparently it is of little importance compared to hunting, as it can withstand more or less any forest condition. Nevertheless, the main cause of drastic reduction of the species is likely caused by the Allee effect.

The Bornean rhino in Sabah was confirmed to be extinct in the wild in April 2015, with only 3 individuals left in captivity. The mainland Sumatran rhino in Malaysia was confirmed to be extinct in the wild in August 2015. In March 2016 there was a rare sighting of a Sumatran rhino in East Kalimantan, the Indonesian part of Borneo. The last time there was a Sumatran rhino in the Kalimantan area was approximately 40 years ago. This optimism was met with despair as the same rhino named Najaq was found dead several weeks after the sighting. The cause of death was infection on the wound caused by snare.

=== In captivity ===
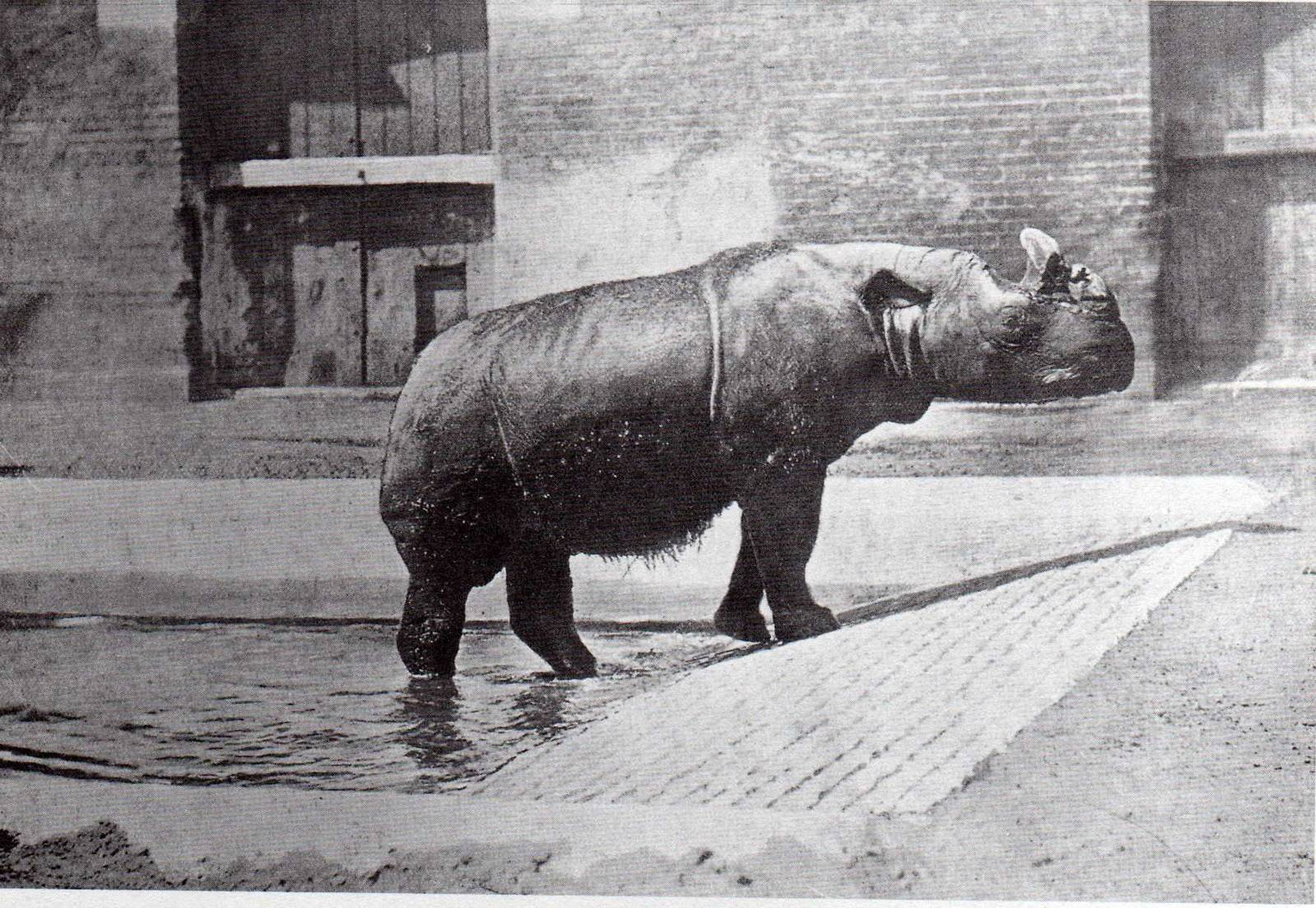
The female D. s. lasiotis "Begum", which was shown in London Zoo from 15 February 1872 to 31 August 1900

Sumatran rhinos do not thrive outside of their ecosystem. London Zoo acquired a bull and cow in 1872 that had been captured in Chittagong in 1868. The female named "Begum" survived until 1900, the record lifetime for a captive rhino. Begum was one of at least seven specimens of the extinct subspecies D. s. lasiotis that were held in zoos and circuses. In 1972, Subur, the only Sumatran rhino remaining in captivity, died at the Copenhagen Zoo.

Despite the species' persistent lack of reproductive success, in the early 1980s, some conservation organizations began a captive-breeding program for the Sumatran rhinoceros. Between 1984 and 1996, this ex situ conservation program transported 40 Sumatran rhinos from their native habitats to zoos and reserves across the world. While hopes were initially high, and much research was conducted on the captive specimens, by the late 1990s, not a single rhino had been born in the program, and most of its proponents agreed the program had been a failure. In 1997, the IUCN's Asian rhino specialist group, which once endorsed the program, declared it had failed "even maintaining the species within acceptable limits of mortality", noting that, in addition to the lack of births, 20 of the captured rhinos had died. In 2004, a surra outbreak at the Sumatran Rhinoceros Conservation Centre killed all the captive rhinos in Peninsular Malaysia, reducing the population of captive rhinos to eight.

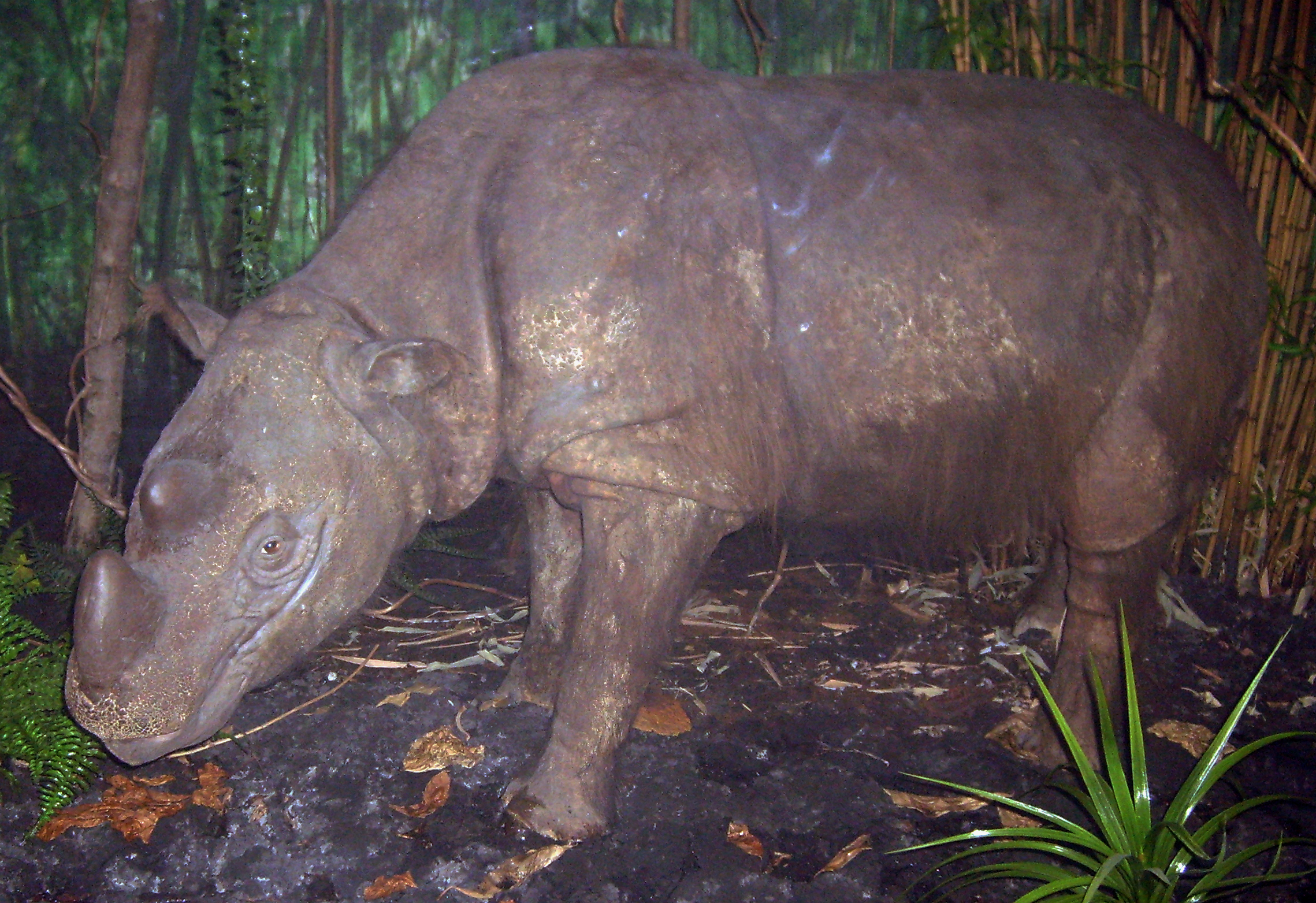
The preserved remains of the last Sumatran rhinoceros in captivity by the 1970s, a female called "Subur" which died in 1972. "Subur" means "fertile" in Malay.

Seven of these captive rhinos were sent to the United States, and three to Port Lympne Zoo in the United Kingdom (the other was kept in Southeast Asia), but by 1997, their numbers had dwindled to three: a cow in the Los Angeles Zoo, a bull in the Cincinnati Zoo, and a cow in the Bronx Zoo. In a final effort, the three rhinos were united in Cincinnati. After years of failed attempts, the cow from Los Angeles, Emi, became pregnant for the sixth time, with the zoo's bull Ipuh. All five of her previous pregnancies ended in failure. Reproductive physiologist at the Cincinnati Zoo, Terri Roth, had learned from previous failures, though, and with the aid of special hormone treatments, Emi gave birth to a healthy male calf named Andalas (an Indonesian literary word for Sumatra) in September 2001. Andalas's birth was the first successful captive birth of a Sumatran rhino in 112 years. A female calf, named "Suci" (Indonesian for "pure"), followed on 30 July 2004. On 29 April 2007, Emi gave birth a third time, to her second male calf, named Harapan (Indonesian for "hope") or Harry. In 2007, Andalas, who had been living at the Los Angeles Zoo, was returned to Sumatra to take part in breeding programs with healthy females, leading to the siring and 23 June 2012 birth of male calf Andatu, the fourth captive-born calf of the era; Andalas had been mated with Ratu, a wild-born cow living in the Rhino Sanctuary at Way Kambas National Park.

Despite the recent successes in Cincinnati, the captive-breeding program has remained controversial. Proponents argue that the zoos have not only aided the conservation effort by studying the reproductive habits, raising public awareness and education about the rhinos, helping raise financial resources for conservation efforts in Sumatra but, moreover, to have established a small captive breeding group. Opponents of the captive breeding program argue that the losses are too great; the program is too expensive; removing rhinos from their habitat, even temporarily, alters their ecological role; and captive populations cannot match the rate of recovery seen in well-protected native habitats. In October 2015, Harapan, the last rhino in the Western Hemisphere, left the Cincinnati Zoo to Indonesia.

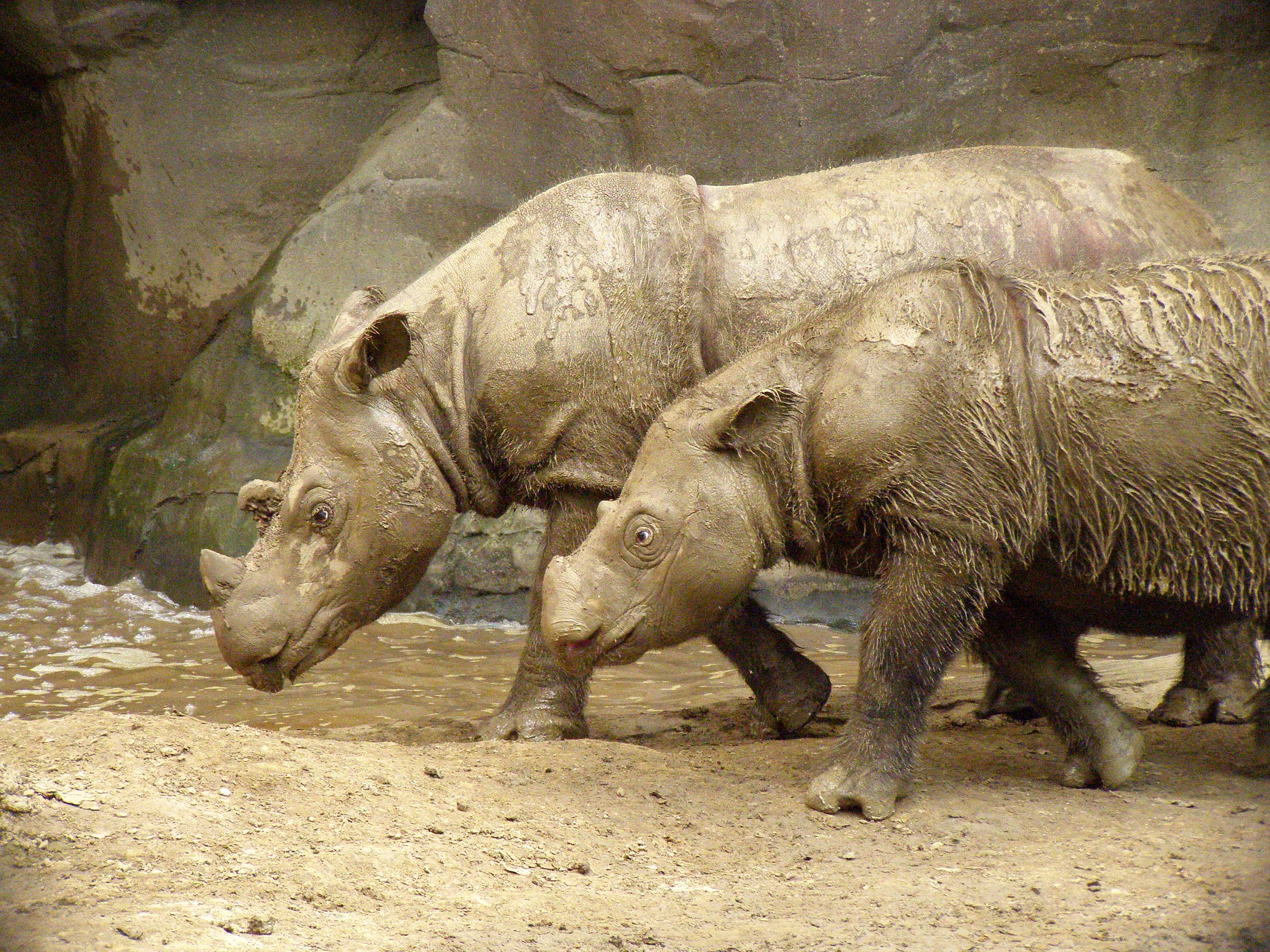
Sumatran rhinos Emi and Harapan at the Cincinnati Zoo

In August 2016, there were only three Sumatran rhinos left in Malaysia, all in captivity in the eastern state of Sabah: A bull named Tam and two cows named Puntung and Iman. In June 2017, Puntung was put down due to skin cancer. Tam died on 27 May 2019 and Iman died of cancer on 23 November 2019 at the Borneo Rhino Sanctuary. The species became extinct in Malaysia, its native land in 2019.

In Indonesia, meanwhile, a seventh rhino increased the group at the Sumatran Rhino Sanctuary, in Way Kambas NP. A female was born on 12 May 2016, named Delilah. Another female, daughter of Andatu and Rosa, was born on 24 March 2022, named Sedah Mirah. A female was born on 30 September 2023, the third child of Andalas-Ratu pair. A male calf was born on 26 November 2023, son of Delilah and Harapan.

In Indonesian East Kalimantan, only one old (estimated to be 35 to 40 years old) female named Pahu lives in Sumatran Rhino Sanctuary (SRS) Kelian, West Kutai after being captured in 2018, another identified is Pari, a female who lives in the wild in Sungai Ratah-Sungai Nyuatan-Sungai Lawa protected forest. On 31 October 2023, conservationists in Indonesia said they have extracted eggs from Pahu, who were too old and small to breed with the Sumatran subspecies, the eggs are currently planned to be fertilized with sperms from captive male Sumatran rhino before implanted in female Sumatran rhino in SRS Way Kambas.

== Cultural depictions ==
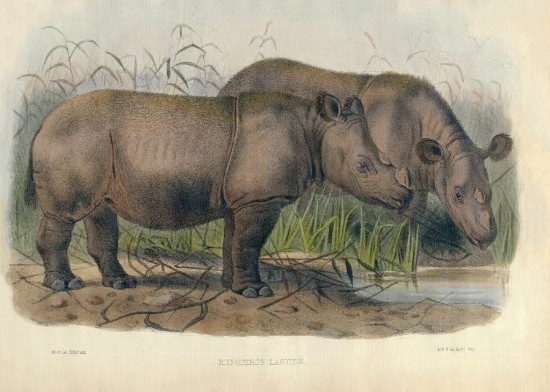
Illustration of 'Begum' from 1872

Aside from those few individuals kept in zoos and pictured in books, the Sumatran rhinoceros has remained little known, overshadowed by the more common Indian, black and white rhinos. Recently, however, video footage of the Sumatran rhinoceros in its native habitat and in breeding centers has been featured in several nature documentaries. Extensive footage can be found in an Asia Geographic documentary The Littlest Rhino. Natural History New Zealand showed footage of a Sumatran rhino, shot by freelance Indonesian-based cameraman Alain Compost, in the 2001 documentary Forgotten Rhino, which featured mainly Javan and Indian rhinos.

Though they were documented by droppings and tracks, pictures of the Bornean rhinoceros were first taken and widely distributed by modern conservationists in April 2006, when camera traps photographed a healthy adult in the jungles of Sabah in Malaysian Borneo. On 24 April 2007, it was announced that cameras had captured the first-ever video footage of a wild Bornean rhino. The night-time footage showed the rhino eating, peering through jungle foliage, and sniffing the film equipment. The World Wildlife Fund, which took the video, has used it in efforts to convince local governments to turn the area into a rhino conservation zone. Monitoring has continued; 50 new cameras have been set up, and in February 2010, what appeared to be a pregnant rhino was filmed.

A number of folk tales about the Sumatran rhino were collected by colonial naturalists and hunters from the mid-19th century to the early 20th century. In Burma, the belief was once widespread that the Sumatran rhino ate fire. Tales described the fire-eating rhino following smoke to its source, especially campfires, and then attacking the camp. There was also a Burmese belief that the best time to hunt was every July, when the Sumatran rhinos would congregate beneath the full moon. In Malaya, it was said that the Sumatran rhino's horns was hollow and could be used as a sort of hose for breathing air and squirting water. In Malaya and Sumatra, it was once believed that the rhino shed its horns every year and buried them under the ground. In Borneo, the rhino was said to have a strange carnivorous practice: after defecating in a stream, it would turn around and eat fish that had been stupefied by the excrement.
