= Terri Roth =

American zoologist

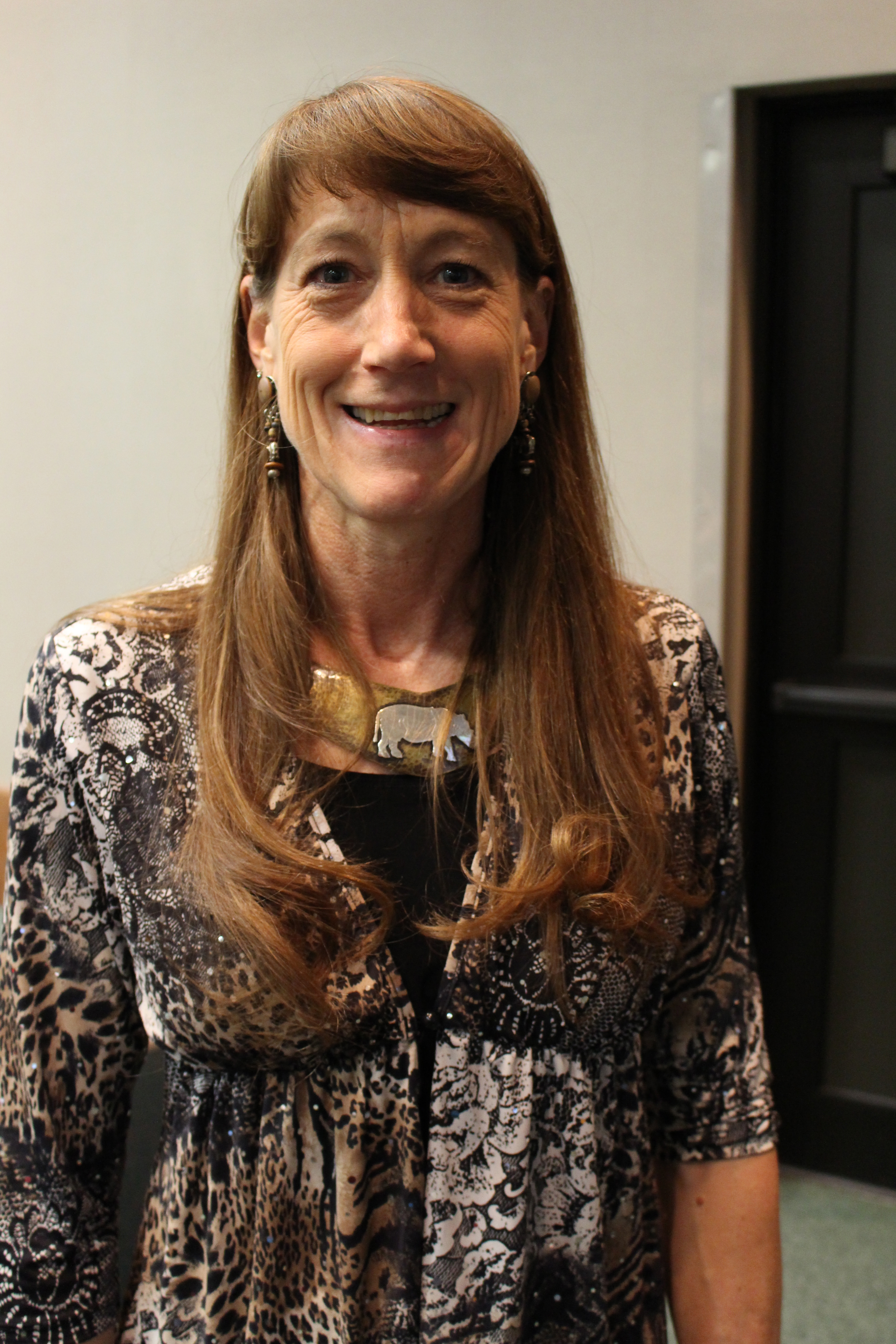
Terri Roth

Terri Lynn Roth (b. 1964/1965) is the vice president of Conservation and Science at the Cincinnati Zoo and Botanical Garden. Additionally, she is the director of the Center for Conservation and Research of Endangered Wildlife (CREW). She has made several breakthroughs in the captive breeding of Sumatran rhinoceroses, a critically endangered species with fewer than 300 left.

== Early life ==
Terri Roth grew up on a small farm in California; she stated that even from a young age, she enjoyed playing with snakes, toads, and lizards, "whatever I could catch." She attended the University of California, Davis, initially majoring in genetics but then switching emphasis to focus on reproductive physiology. She received both her bachelor's and master's degrees at the University of California. She then attended Louisiana State University, earning a PhD in animal reproductive physiology with a minor in immunology. She was then a postdoc at the National Zoo.

== Work ==
=== Rhinoceroses ===
Terri Roth has worked with rhinoceroses since 1995. In 1996, she joined CREW. Prior to that, she had worked at the National Zoo at its Center for Research and Conservation as a gamete biologist. Roth has been an integral part of the Sumatran rhinoceros captive breeding program. Roth is credited with turning the program around: she began using operant conditioning to train captive Sumatran rhinos at the Cincinnati Zoo to tolerate rectal ultrasounds, which allowed the zoo's scientists to observe changes in the ovaries. Roth was able to determine that Sumatran rhinos are induced ovulators, meaning that the female will not release an egg unless she is around a male. After determining how to induce ovulation, the captive breeding program experienced several more setbacks after the female rhino miscarried multiple times. After another pregnancy, Roth decided to supplement the female's diet with the hormone progesterone to attempt to sustain the pregnancy, which was successful. The first Sumatran rhino born from the captive breeding program was born 13 September 2001. Since all remaining Sumatran rhinos have since been transferred back to their native range, Roth has traveled to Indonesia several times to share the assisted reproductive technology developed at the Cincinnati Zoo with local veterinarians. Her breakthroughs in Sumatran rhino breeding were the subject of a 2007 children's book, Emi and the Rhino Scientist.

She has also been a board member of the International Rhino Foundation since 2002.

=== Other species ===
Terri Roth has authored or coauthored several papers relating to artificial reproductive technology in animals. Subjects of her research include cheetahs, clouded leopards, and the scimitar oryx. She has also worked with polar bears, including conducting assessments of fertility, artificial insemination, and creating a polar bear sperm bank.

== Awards and honors ==
In 2004, Terri Roth received the Chevron Texaco Conservation Award for her work with Sumatran rhinos. In 2012, Roth was a nominee for the Indianapolis Prize.
