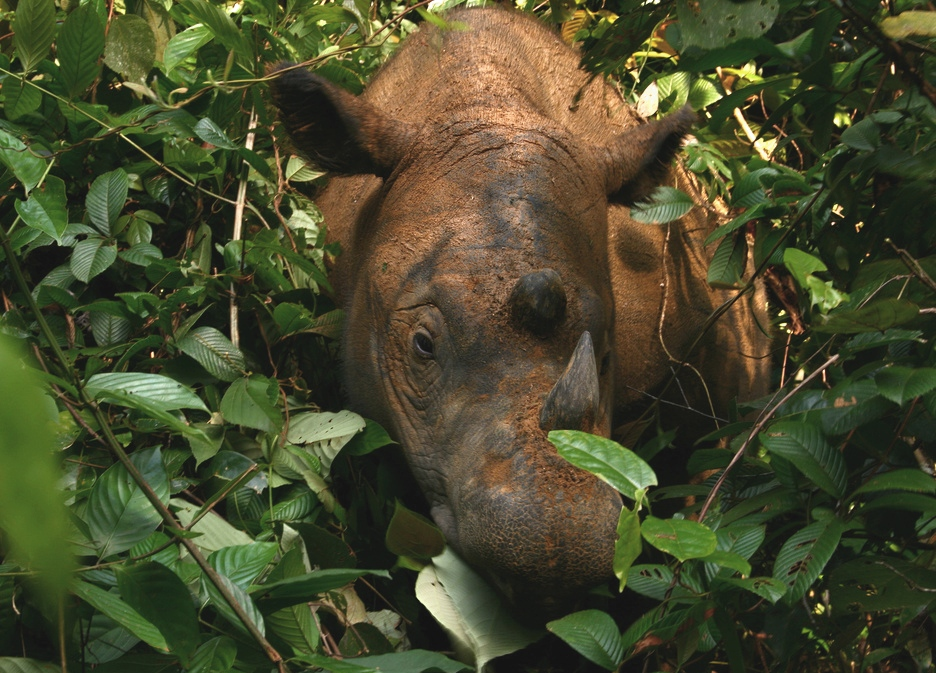
- An individual at Way Kambas National Park

Conservation status
- Critically Endangered (IUCN 3.1)

Scientific classification
- Kingdom: Animalia
- Phylum: Chordata
- Class: Mammalia
- Order: Perissodactyla
- Family: Rhinocerotidae
- Genus: Dicerorhinus
- Species: D. sumatrensis
- Subspecies: D. s. sumatrensis

Trinomial name
- Dicerorhinus sumatrensis sumatrensis Fischer, 1814

Synonyms
- • Dicerorhinus sumatrensis niger

= Western Sumatran rhinoceros =

Subspecies of mammal

The western Sumatran rhinoceros (Dicerorhinus sumatrensis sumatrensis) is a subspecies of the Sumatran rhinoceros (Dicerorhinus sumatrensis) that is native to Sumatra, primarily within these Indonesian national parks: Bukit Barisan Selatan National Park, Kerinci Seblat National Park, Mount Leuser National Park, and its population is partially remaining in Way Kambas National Park. The subspecies went extinct in the Malaysian Peninsula. Its population is limited, with only around 275 rhinos left in the wild, from which they are being threatened by poaching, and occasional habitat loss. A few individuals are being held and bred in captivity within the Sumatran Rhino Sanctuary, of which some originate from the Cincinnati Zoo and Botanical Garden.
