= Kelian mine =

Mine in Indonesia

- Location: East Kalimantan, Indonesia
- Products: Gold, silver

The Kelian mine was one of the largest gold mines in Indonesia and in the world. until its closure in 2004. The mine was located in the east of the country in East Kalimantan and was operated by the Rio Tinto corporation in conjunction with Buana Jaya Raya Indonesia to form PT Kelian Equatorial Mining (KEM). The mine has estimated reserves of 7.8 million oz of gold.

== Controversy during operation ==
When KEM first established the mine, the local communities surrounding the mines were forbidden from mining for gold or growing crops near the mine, with many people also being evicted from their homes as well. This upended the livelihoods of the locals and led to community action. This community action was also largely suppressed by KEM through harsh security tactics, often with local police complicity.

Along with these arrests and evictions there were a number of cases of KEM employees sexually assaulting local women and girls.

== Controversy after closure ==
The group LKMTL, which has historically organized and represented the local people against KEM, has cited a number of environmental concerns on the 6,670 hectare site as well as improper compensation for the decades of human rights abuses wrought on the locals by Rio Tinto and KEM. Rio Tinto has paid $5.4 million (US) to those who made claims against the company.
