= Way Kambas National Park =

National park in Sumatra, Indonesia

- Indonesian: Taman Nasional Way Kambas
- IUCN category II (national park)
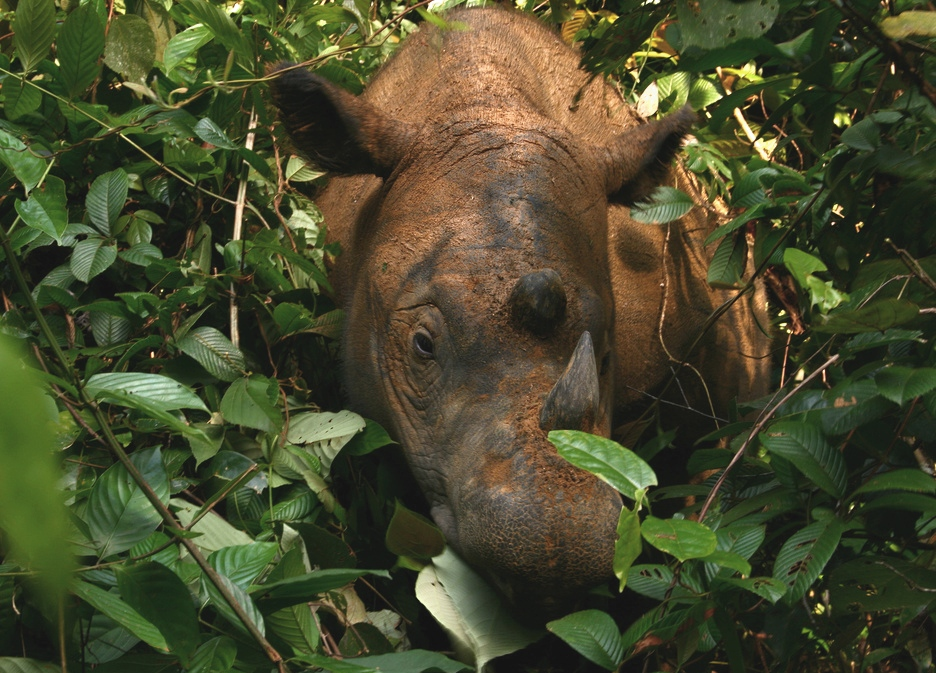
- Sumatran rhino in the Way Kambas Sanctuary

- Location within Sumatra Location within Indonesia
- Location: Sukadana, East Lampung Regency, Lampung, Sumatra, Indonesia
- Nearest city: Bandar Lampung, Metro
- Coordinates: 4°55′S 105°45′E
- Area: 1,300 km^{2} (500 sq mi)
- Established: 1989
- Visitors: 2,553 (in 2007)
- Governing body: Ministry of Forestry

Way Kambas National Park is a national park covering 1,300 km^{2} (500 sq mi) in Lampung province of southern Sumatra, Indonesia. It consists of swamp forest and lowland rain forest, mostly of secondary growth as result of extensive logging in the 1960s and 1970s. Despite decreasing populations, the park still has a few critically endangered Sumatran tigers, Sumatran elephants and Sumatran rhinoceroses. It also hosts over 400 bird species.

In 2016, Way Kambas was formally declared an ASEAN Heritage Park.

Threats to the park are posed by poaching and habitat loss due to illegal logging. Conservation efforts include patrolling and the establishment of the Sumatran Rhino Sanctuary and the Elephant Conservation Centre.

In 2019 and 2021, the International Rhino Foundation was working to capture three Sumatran rhinoceros in the park.

== Flora and fauna ==
Plant species include Avicennia marina, Sonneratia species, Nypa fruticans, Melaleuca leucadendra, Syzygium polyanthum, Pandanus species, Schima wallichii, Shorea species, Dipterocarpus gracilis, and Gonystylus bancanus. The sandy shores of the park are dominated by Casuarina equisetifolia.

The park has 50 species of mammal, many of them critically endangered. There are only 12-14 Sumatran rhinoceros in the area, down from around 40 in the 1990s. The number of Sumatran elephants in the park was estimated to be 247 in 2015. The population of Sumatran tigers has declined from 36-40 in 2000 to fewer than 30. Other mammals in the park are the Malayan tapir, Sumatran dhole (Cuon alpinus sumatrensis) and siamang (Symphalangus syndactylus syndactylus).

About half of the bird species inhabit the coastal swamps, including mangroves, riverine forest, freshwater and peat swamp forest, and the marshes of the area. The park is one of the last strongholds of the white-winged wood duck, with a population between 24-38 birds left, the largest in Sumatra. Among the other 405 species of bird recorded in the park, are the Storm's stork, woolly-necked stork, lesser adjutant, crested fireback, great argus and Oriental darter.

Among reptiles, the endangered false gharial crocodile is found in the coastal swamps.

== Threats and conservation ==
Way Kambas was established as game reserve by the Dutch administration in 1937, and in 1989 was declared a National Park.

Significant encroachment has occurred along the southern boundary of the park by villagers claiming traditional land rights. Roads and trails into the park are starting points for illegal logging that penetrates into the interior of the park. This resulted in the forest coverage declining to 60% of the park. In 2009-10 an area of 6,000 hectares which had been occupied by squatters for decades was cleared of them.

Wells left behind by relocated communities in 1984 have proven to be deadly traps for the animals, including baby elephants, rhinos and tigers. In a conservation effort between 2008 and 2010 around 2,000 such wells have been closed.

Poaching has been a significant threat, often involving soldiers and in a 2002 case even military officers. In recent years poaching has been reported to be more under control, with no cases of rhinoceros poaching, and no cases of tiger poaching reported between 2004 and 2011.

In early 2011 the Ministry of Forestry announced the allocation of funds to establish a rare flora and fauna rehabilitation centre in the park.

=== Sumatran Rhino Sanctuary ===
A managed breeding centre named Sumatran Rhino Sanctuary (SRS) of 250 acres (100 ha) was built up in 2023. The goal of the sanctuary is to maintain a small number of rhinos for research, "insurance", awareness-building, and the long-term goal of developing a breeding program, to help ensure the survival of the species in the wild. The founding population was five Sumatran rhinos, most have been moved from zoos to the large enclosures with natural habitat at the SRS. Since 1997, Rhino Protection Units have been established. These are trained anti-poaching teams of 4-6 people that patrol a minimum of 15 days per month the key areas of the park to deactivate traps and identify illegal intruders. Andatu, a calf who was born on June 23, 2013, is the fourth calf live in the zoo all over the world or semi-in-situ captive breeding likes in Way Kambas Sumatran Rhino Sanctuary. The mother is Ratu and the father is Andalas who came from Cincinnati, US, in 2007. In earlier October 2003, Andatu height is almost the same of the mother height. The Sanctuary is not open to public. There are currently 10 rhinos living in the sanctuary, Sedah Mirah (female), Rosa (female), Bina (female), Ratu (female), Delilah (female), Anggi (female), Andalas (male), Harapan (male), Andatu (male), and Indra (male calf). The most recent birth was Indra male calf in 25 November 2023.

=== Elephant–human conflict ===
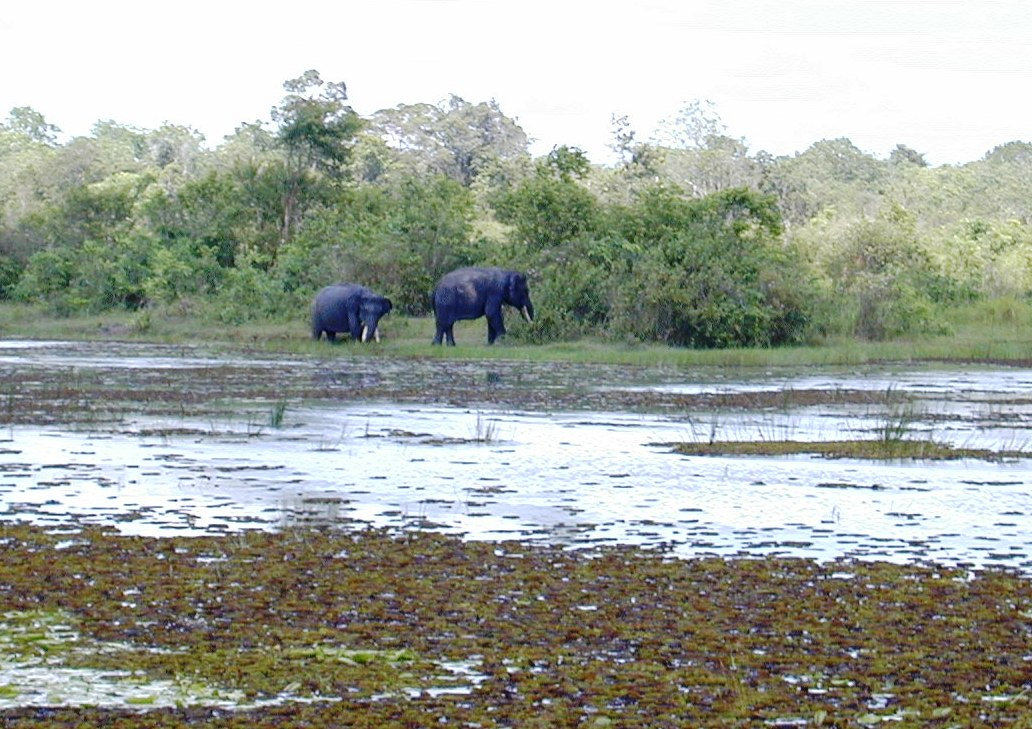
Elephants in the Way Kambas Conservation Centre

A significant source of conflict between the park and surrounding communities is posed by crop raiding wild elephants. In a study conducted in the 1990s, it was recorded that wild elephants damaged over 45 hectares of corn, rice, cassava, beans and other crops, and around 900 coconut, banana and other trees in 18 villages around the park. Over a period of 12 years, elephants killed or injured 24 people near the park. Villagers attempt to reduce elephant damage by guarding fields, digging trenches between, and modifying their cropping patterns. In 2010 it was reported that villagers used bonfires around their homes to scare away the elephants while forest rangers have been using tame elephants to help drive away wild herds.

=== Elephant Conservation Centre ===
The Elephant Conservation Centre (ECC) was established in the 1980s. The elephants in the centre have been domesticated and are used for heavy work, ecotourism, patrol and breeding. Paintings created by elephants at the centre are sold by Novica, a commercial online arts agent associated with the National Geographic Society, with about half of the proceeds assisting endangered elephants throughout Asia.

The ECC will be provided with an elephant hospital which will become the first of its kind in Indonesia and the largest in Asia. The elephant hospital will be built on a 5-hectare area with a Rp10 billion ($1.11 million) investment and expected to start operations in 2014.

During 2016 and 2017, the Centre saw six new calves born. Chusnunia Chalim, regent of East Lampung, has hoped to promote awareness of the whole park through the Centre.
