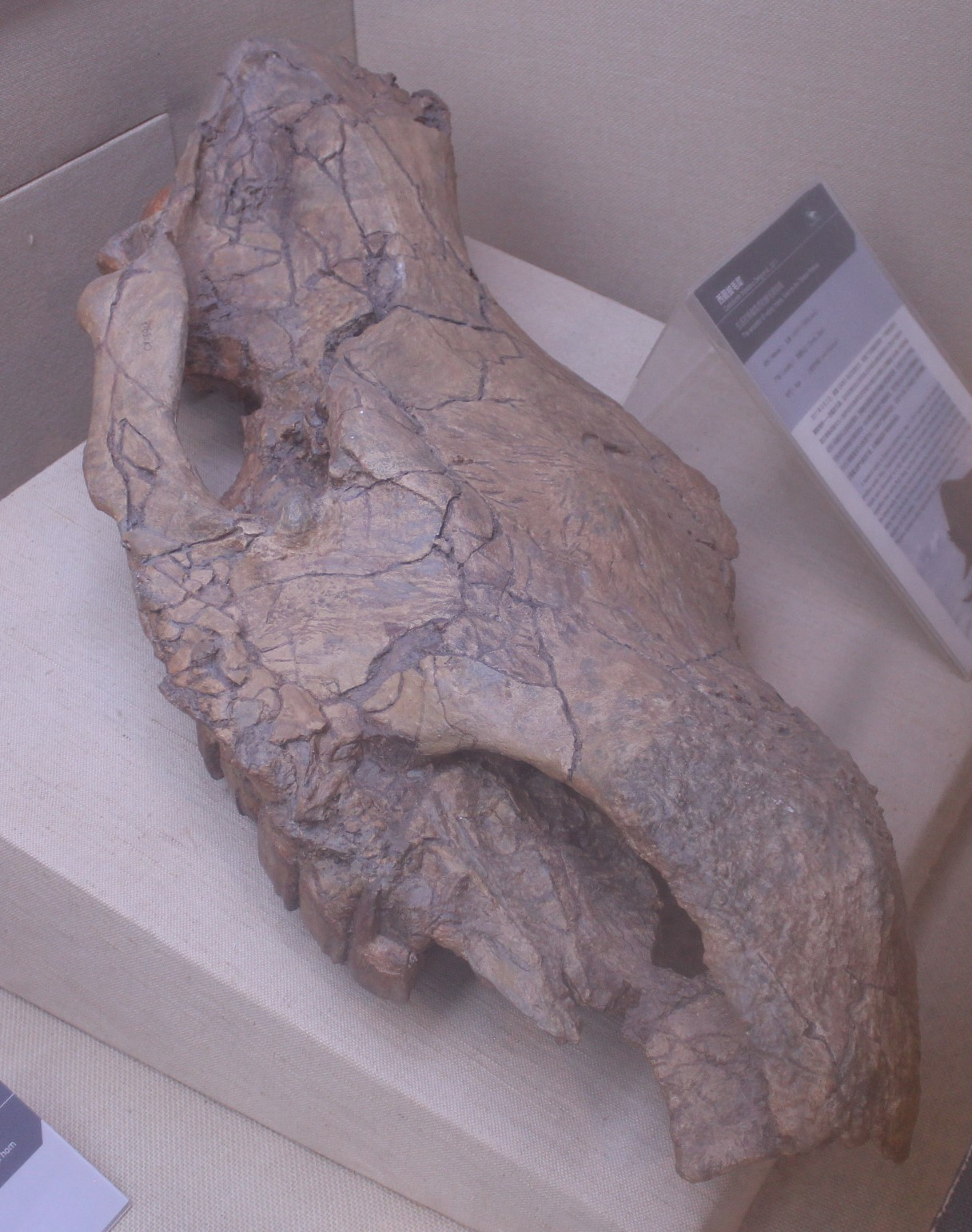
- Holotype skull (IVPP V15908), Paleozoological Museum of China

Scientific classification
- Kingdom: Animalia
- Phylum: Chordata
- Class: Mammalia
- Infraclass: Placentalia
- Order: Perissodactyla
- Family: Rhinocerotidae
- Genus: †Coelodonta
- Species: †C. thibetana

Binomial name
- †Coelodonta thibetana Deng, "et al" 2011

= Coelodonta thibetana =

Coelodonta thibetana Temporal range: Middle Pliocene

Extinct species of mammal

Coelodonta thibetana, the Tibetan woolly rhinoceros, is an extinct species of the genus Coelodonta native to western Himalayas that lived during the middle Pliocene epoch. C. thibetana is known from the holotype IVPP V15908, a partially complete skull including incomplete lower jaw preserved with full dentition. It was first named by Tao Deng, Xiaoming Wang, Mikael Fortelius, Qiang Li, Yang Wang, Zhijie J. Tseng, Gary T. Takeuchi, Joel E. Saylor, Laura K. Säilä and Guangpu Xie in 2011.

== Phylogeny ==
The descriptors conducted a phylogenetic analysis of the five living rhinoceros species and thirteen extinct species. They qualify following cladogram, where C. thibetana was awarded a basal position within its genus.

- - Ronzotherium
  - - - Lartetotherium
      - - Ceratotherium simum (White Rhinoceros)
        - Diceros bicornis (Black Rhinoceros)
    - - Dicerorhinus sumatrensis (Sumatran Rhinoceros)
      - Rhinoceros
        - Rhinoceros sondaicus (Javan Rhinoceros)
        - Rhinoceros unicornis (Indian Rhinoceros)
      - - Dihoplus megarhinus
        - - 'Dihoplus' kirchbergensis
          - Dihoplus pikermiensis
          - Dihoplus ringstroemi
          - - Stephanorhinus etruscus
            - Stephanorhinus hundsheimensis
            - - Stephanorhinus hemitoechus
              - Coelodonta (Woolly rhinoceros)
                - Coelodonta thibetana
                - - Coelodonta nihowanensis
                  - - Coelodonta tologoijensis
                    - Coelodonta antiquitatis
