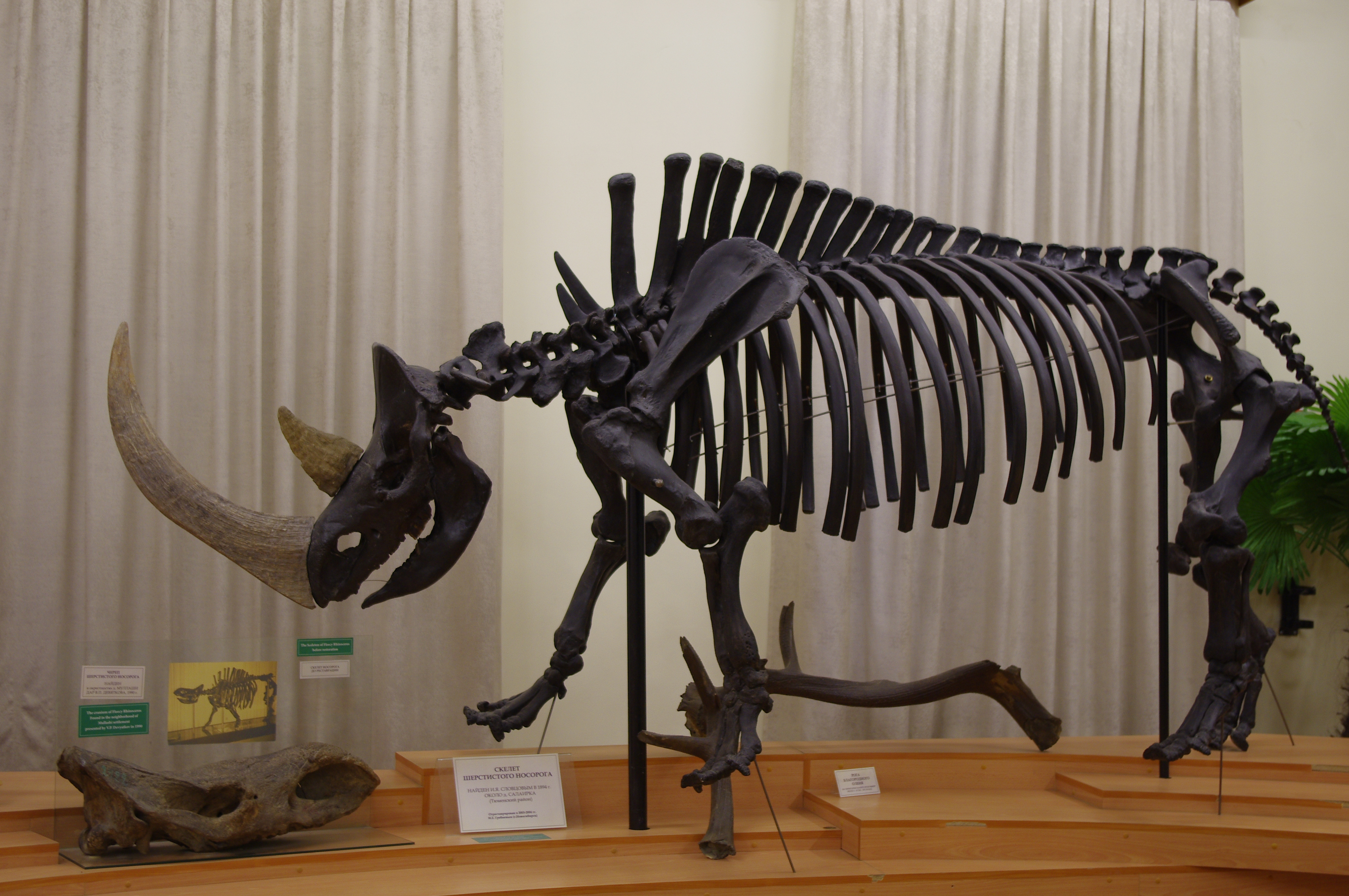
- Skeleton of the woolly rhinoceros, Coelodonta antiquitatis.

Scientific classification
- Kingdom: Animalia
- Phylum: Chordata
- Class: Mammalia
- Order: Perissodactyla
- Family: Rhinocerotidae
- Tribe: Dicerorhinini
- Genus: †Coelodonta; Bronn, 1831

Type species
- Coelodonta antiquitatis (Blumenbach, 1799)

Species
- Coelodonta antiquitatis (Blumenbach, 1799) (type species); Coelodonta nihowanensis Chow, 1978; Coelodonta thibetana Deng, et al., 2011; Coelodonta tologoijensis Beliajeva, 1966

= Coelodonta =

Coelodonta Temporal range: Pliocene-Late Pleistocene 3.7–0.014 Ma

Extinct genus of rhinoceros

Coelodonta (/koʊiloʊˈdɒntə/, from the Ancient Greek κοῖλος (koîlos), meaning "hollow", and οδούς (odoús), meaning "tooth", in reference to the deep grooves of their molars) is an extinct genus of Eurasian rhinoceroses that lived from about 3.7 million years to 14,000 years ago, between the Pliocene and Pleistocene epochs. It is best known from the type species, the woolly rhinoceros (Coelodonta antiquitatis), which ranged throughout northern Eurasia during the Pleistocene. The earliest known species, Coelodonta thibetana, lived in Tibet during the Pliocene, with the genus spreading to the rest of Eurasia during the Pleistocene.

Coelodonta presumably grew to be around 3.6m long and 1.7m tall.

== Species ==
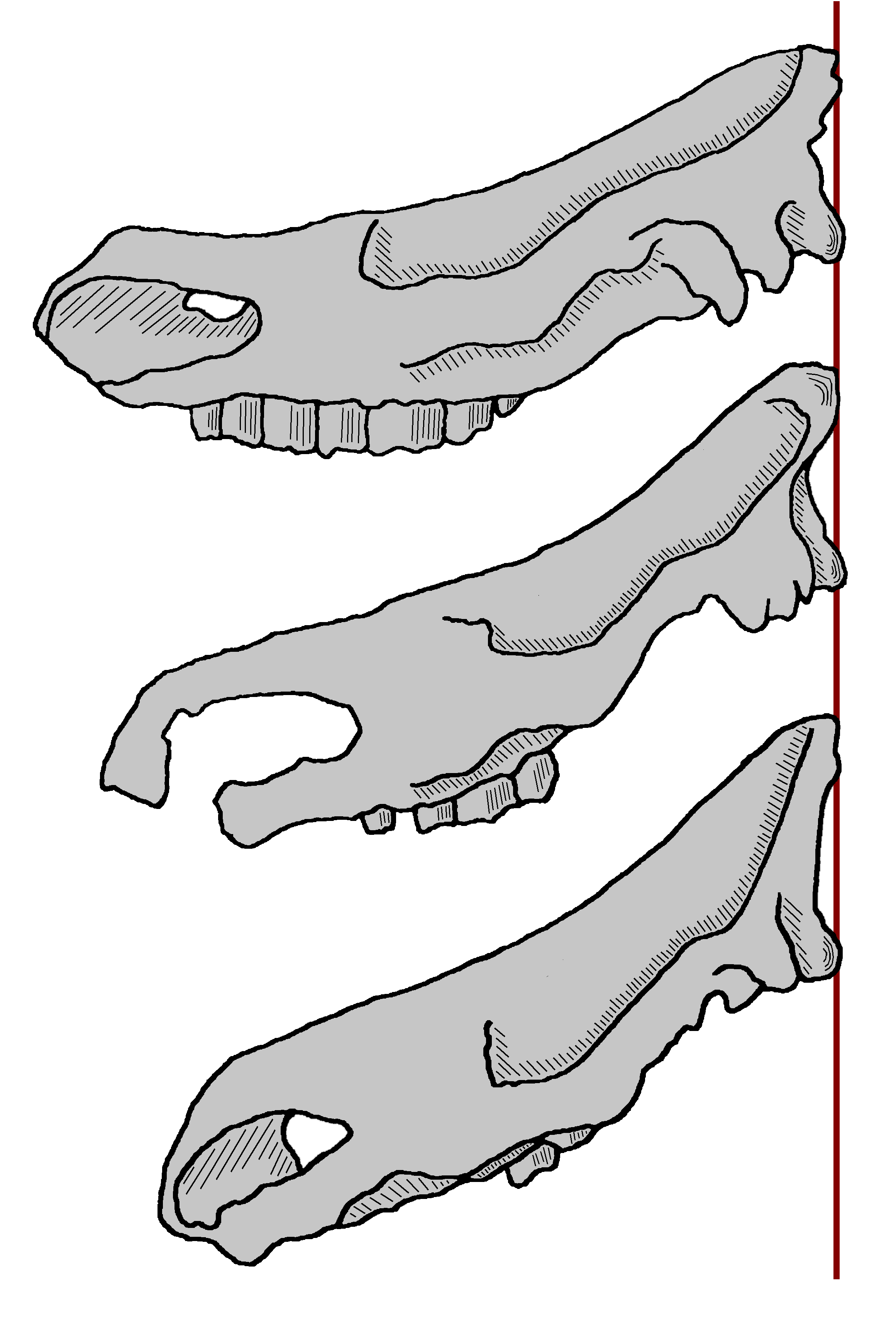
Skulls of Coelodonta species: from top to bottom, C. nihowanensis, C. tologoijensis and C. antiquitatis.

Species recognised as members of Coelodonta, according to Deng et al. (2011), include:

- Coelodonta thibetana (Deng et al. 2011): The most primitive species of the genus, inhabited the Tibetan Plateau during the Pliocene.
- Coelodonta nihowanensis (Chow, 1978): A primitive species from northern China, it lived in the earliest Pleistocene.
- Coelodonta tologoijensis (Beliajeva, 1966): Appeared in northern China around 2 million years ago, and was present in eastern Eurasia during the Early-Middle Pleistocene.
- Coelodonta antiquitatis (Blumenbach, 1799): The type species of the genus, commonly known as the woolly rhinoceros. It lived in the steppes of northern Eurasia during the Middle and Late Pleistocene, and was the last living representative of the genus.

== Phylogeny ==
DNA evidence suggests that the Sumatran rhinoceros (Dicerorhinus sumatrensis) is the closest living relative of Coelodonta, with Coelodonta also being closely related to the extinct genus Stephanorhinus.

Cladogram of living and subfossil rhinoceros species based on nuclear DNA after Liu et al, 2021:

- - Elasmotheriinae
    †Elasmotherium
  - Rhinocerotinae
    - - Black rhinoceros (Diceros bicornis)
      - White rhinoceros (Ceratotherium simum)
    - - - Indian rhinoceros (Rhinoceros unicornis)
        - Javan rhinoceros (Rhinoceros sondaicus)
      - - Sumatran rhinoceros (Dicerorhinus sumatrensis)
        - - † Woolly rhinoceros (Coelodonta antiquitatis)
          - † Merck's rhinoceros (Stephanorhinus kirchbergensis)

† denotes extinct taxa

Bayesian morphological phylogeny (Pandolfi, 2023) Note: This excludes living African rhinoceros species.

- - Rhinocerotina
    - - Gaindatherium browni
      - Lartetotherium sansaniense
    - - - Nesorhinus
          - Nesorhinus hayasakai
          - Nesorhinus philippinensis
        - Rhinoceros
          - Rhinoceros sondaicus (Javan rhinoceros)
          - Rhinoceros unicornis (Indian rhinoceros)
      - - Dicerorhinus
          - Dicerorhinus gwebinensis
          - - Dicerorhinus fusuiensis
            - Dicerorhinus sumatrensis (Sumatran rhinoceros)
        - - Dihoplus schleiermacheri
          - - "Dihoplus" pikermiensis
            - - Coelodonta
                - Coelodonta thibetana
                - - Coelodonta nihowanensis
                  - - Coelodonta tologoijensis
                    - Coelodonta antiquitatis (woolly rhinoceros)
              - - Pliorhinus
                  - Pliorhinus megarhinus
                  - Pliorhinus miguelcrusafonti
                - Stephanorhinus
                  - Stephanorhinus jeanvireti
                  - - Stephanorhinus etruscus
                    - - Stephanorhinus hundsheimensis
                      - - Stephanorhinus hemitoechus (Narrow-nosed or steppe rhinoceros)
                        - Stephanorhinus kirchbergensis (Merck's or forest rhinoceros)
