= Whitemoor =

Whitemoor may refer to:

- Whitemoor, Cornwall, England, a village
- Whitemoor, Nottinghamshire, area of the City of Nottingham, England
- Whitemoor Haye, area in the floodplain of the River Tame, Staffordshire, England
- Whitemoor (HM Prison), prison in Cambridgeshire, England
- Whitemoor marshalling yards, marshalling yards in Cambridgeshire, England
- Whitemoor, a pit in the Selby Coalfield, England

== See also ==
- Harap Alb, a Romanian-language fairy tale, often translated as "White Moor"
- Whitemore (disambiguation)
