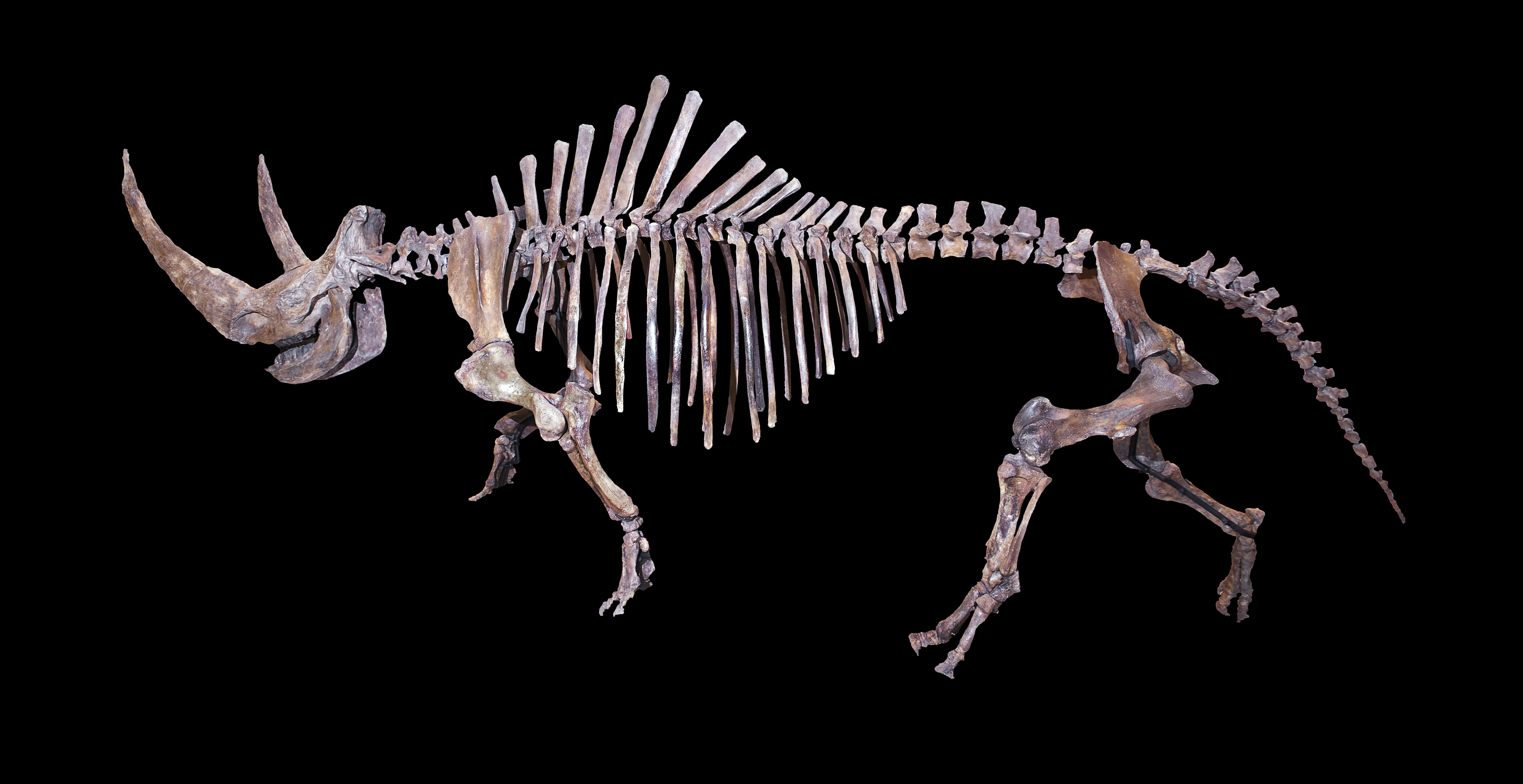
- Woolly rhinoceros skeleton

Scientific classification
- Kingdom: Animalia
- Phylum: Chordata
- Class: Mammalia
- Order: Perissodactyla
- Family: Rhinocerotidae
- Genus: †Coelodonta
- Species: †C. antiquitatis

Binomial name
- †Coelodonta antiquitatis (Blumenbach, 1799)

Subspecies
- C. a. praecursor Guérin, 1980; C. a. antiquitatis Guérin, 1980

Synonyms
- Rhinoceros lenenesis Pallas; Rhinoceros antiquitatis Blumenbach; Rhinoceros tichorhinus Fischer.

= Woolly rhinoceros =

Woolly rhinoceros Temporal range: Middle Pleistocene–Late Pleistocene (possible early Holocene records)

Extinct species of mammal

The woolly rhinoceros (Coelodonta antiquitatis) is an extinct species of rhinoceros that inhabited northern Eurasia during the Pleistocene epoch. The woolly rhinoceros was large, comparable in size to the largest living rhinoceros species, the white rhinoceros (Ceratotherium simum), and covered with long, thick hair that allowed it to survive in the extremely cold, harsh mammoth steppe. It had a massive hump reaching from its shoulder and fed mainly by grazing on herbaceous plants that grew in the steppe. Mummified carcasses preserved in permafrost and many bone remains of woolly rhinoceroses have been found. Images of woolly rhinoceroses are found among cave paintings in Europe and Asia, and evidence has been found suggesting that the species was hunted by humans. Like other Pleistocene megafauna, the species became extinct as part of the end-Pleistocene extinction event. The range of the woolly rhinoceros contracted towards Siberia beginning around 17,000 years ago, with the youngest reliable records being around 14,000 years old in northeast Siberia, coinciding with the Bølling–Allerød warming, which likely disrupted its habitat, with environmental DNA records possibly extending the range of the species around 9,800 years ago. Its closest living relative is the Sumatran rhinoceros (Dicerorhinus sumatrensis).

== Taxonomy ==
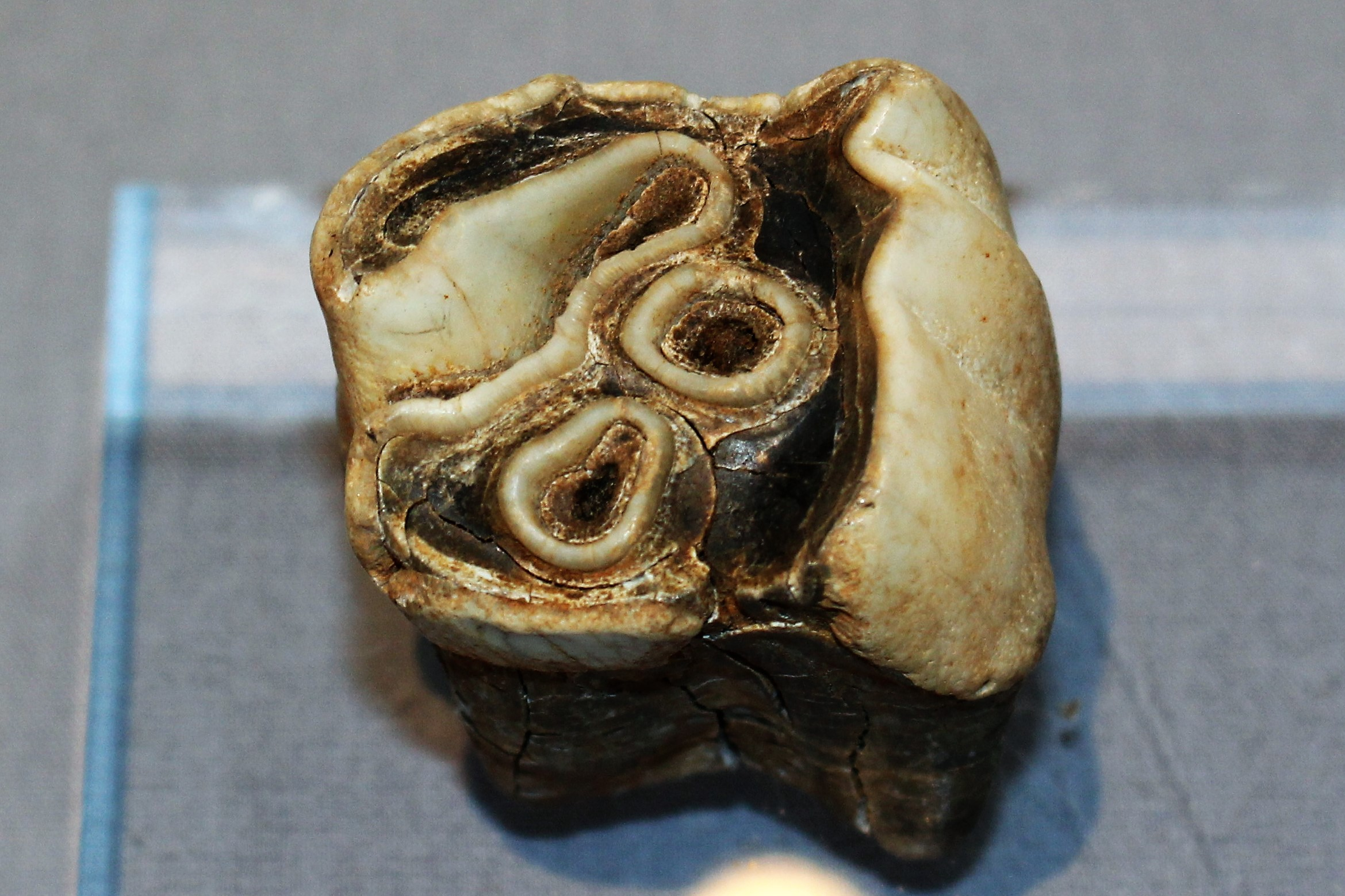
Molar tooth showing the cavity the genus was named for

Woolly rhinoceros remains have been known long before the species was described and were the basis for some mythical creatures. Native peoples of Siberia believed their horns were the claws of giant birds. A rhinoceros skull was found in Klagenfurt, Austria, in 1335, and was believed to be that of a dragon. In 1590, it was used as the basis for the head on a statue of a lindworm. Gotthilf Heinrich von Schubert maintained the belief that the horns were the claws of giant birds, and classified the animal under the name Gryphus antiquitatis, meaning "griffin of antiquity".

One of the earliest scientific descriptions of an ancient rhinoceros species was made in 1769, when the naturalist Peter Simon Pallas wrote a report on his expeditions to Siberia where he found a skull and two horns in the permafrost. In 1772, Pallas acquired a head and two legs of a rhinoceros from the locals in Irkutsk, and named the species Rhinoceros lenenesis (after the Lena River). In 1799, Johann Friedrich Blumenbach studied rhinoceros bones from the collection of the University of Göttingen, and proposed the scientific name Rhinoceros antiquitatis. The geologist Heinrich Georg Bronn moved the species to Coelodonta in 1831 because of its differences in dental formation with members of the Rhinoceros genus. This name comes from the Greek words κοιλος (koilos, "hollow") and ὀδούς (odoús "tooth"), from the depression in the rhino's molar structure, giving the scientific name Coelodonta antiquitatis, "hollow-tooth of antiquity".

=== Evolution ===
The woolly rhinoceros was the most recent species of the genus Coelodonta. The closest living relative of Coelodonta is the Sumatran rhinoceros, and the genus is also closely related to the extinct genus Stephanorhinus. A cladogram showing the relationships of C. antiquitatis to other Late Pleistocene-recent rhinoceros species based on genomic data is given below.

- - Elasmotheriinae
    †Elasmotherium
  - Rhinocerotinae
    - - Black rhinoceros (Diceros bicornis)
      - White rhinoceros (Ceratotherium simum)
    - - - Indian rhinoceros (Rhinoceros unicornis)
        - Javan rhinoceros (Rhinoceros sondaicus)
      - - Sumatran rhinoceros (Dicerorhinus sumatrensis)
        - - † Woolly rhinoceros (Coelodonta antiquitatis)
          - † Merck's rhinoceros (Stephanorhinus kirchbergensis)

Relationships of the woolly rhinoceros based on morphology, excluding African rhinoceros species:

- - Rhinocerotina
    - - Gaindatherium browni
      - Lartetotherium sansaniense
    - - - Nesorhinus
          - Nesorhinus hayasakai
          - Nesorhinus philippinensis
        - Rhinoceros
          - Rhinoceros sondaicus (Javan rhinoceros)
          - Rhinoceros unicornis (Indian rhinoceros)
      - - Dicerorhinus
          - Dicerorhinus gwebinensis
          - - Dicerorhinus fusuiensis
            - Dicerorhinus sumatrensis (Sumatran rhinoceros)
        - - Dihoplus schleiermacheri
          - - "Dihoplus" pikermiensis
            - - Coelodonta
                - Coelodonta thibetana
                - - Coelodonta nihowanensis
                  - - Coelodonta tologoijensis
                    - Coelodonta antiquitatis (woolly rhinoceros)
              - - Pliorhinus
                  - Pliorhinus megarhinus
                  - Pliorhinus miguelcrusafonti
                - Stephanorhinus
                  - Stephanorhinus jeanvireti
                  - - Stephanorhinus etruscus
                    - - Stephanorhinus hundsheimensis
                      - - Stephanorhinus hemitoechus (Narrow-nosed or steppe rhinoceros)
                        - Stephanorhinus kirchbergensis (Merck's or forest rhinoceros)

The ancestors of Coelodonta are suggested to have diverged from those of the Sumatran rhinoceros around 9.4 million years ago, with Coelodonta diverging from Stephanorhinus around 5.5 million years ago. The oldest known species of Coelodonta, Coelodonta thibetana is known from the Pliocene of Tibet dating to approximately 3.7 million years ago, with the genus being present in Siberia, Mongolia, and China during the Early Pleistocene. The woolly rhinoceros first appeared during the early Middle Pleistocene in China, and the oldest remains of the species in Europe, which represents the only species of Coelodonta to have been present in the region, date to approximately 450,000 years ago. The woolly rhinoceros is divided into two chrono-subspecies, with C. a. praecursor from the middle Pleistocene and C. a. antiquitatis from the late Pleistocene. Mitochondrial genomes suggest that the last mitochondrial ancestor of Late Pleistocene woolly rhinoceroses lived around 570,000 years ago. There appears to have been some interbreeding between Merck's rhinoceros (Stephanorhinus kirchbergensis) and the woolly rhinoceros in Eastern Eurasia during the Late Pleistocene.

== Description ==
=== Size and general morphology ===
An adult woolly rhinoceros typically measured 3.2–3.6 m (10 ft 6 in – 11 ft 10 in) from head to tail, stood 1.45–1.6 m (4 ft 9 in – 5 ft 3 in) tall at the shoulder, and weighed up to 1.5–2 metric tons (1.7–2.2 short tons) (with some sources estimate the species' maximum shoulder height at 1.88–1.9 m (6 ft 2 in – 6 ft 3 in) and its weight at 2.4–2.9 metric tons (5,300–6,400 lb)) making it comparable in size to the largest living rhinoceros species, the white rhinoceros (Ceratotherium simum). Compared to other rhinoceroses, the woolly rhinoceros had a longer head and body, and shorter legs.

Like the living white rhinoceros, the shoulder was at least sometimes raised with a substantial hump, which may have developed to support the weight of the animal’s large head and horns. Unlike the hump of the white rhinoceros, the hump of the woolly rhinoceros contained substantial fat reserves (probably predominantly white fat), the most substantial on the entire body. The hump likely served for thermoregulation (reducing the surface-area-to-volume ratio to make keeping the body warm more efficient) and/or as a storage for energy gained during warmer months to use during cold months. Aside from depictions in cave paintings, a hump is only definitively known from a single mummified subadult specimen (around 4–4.5 years old), and it is possible that the hump was a juvenile only feature or that the size/presence of the hump varied seasonally.

=== Skull and dentition ===
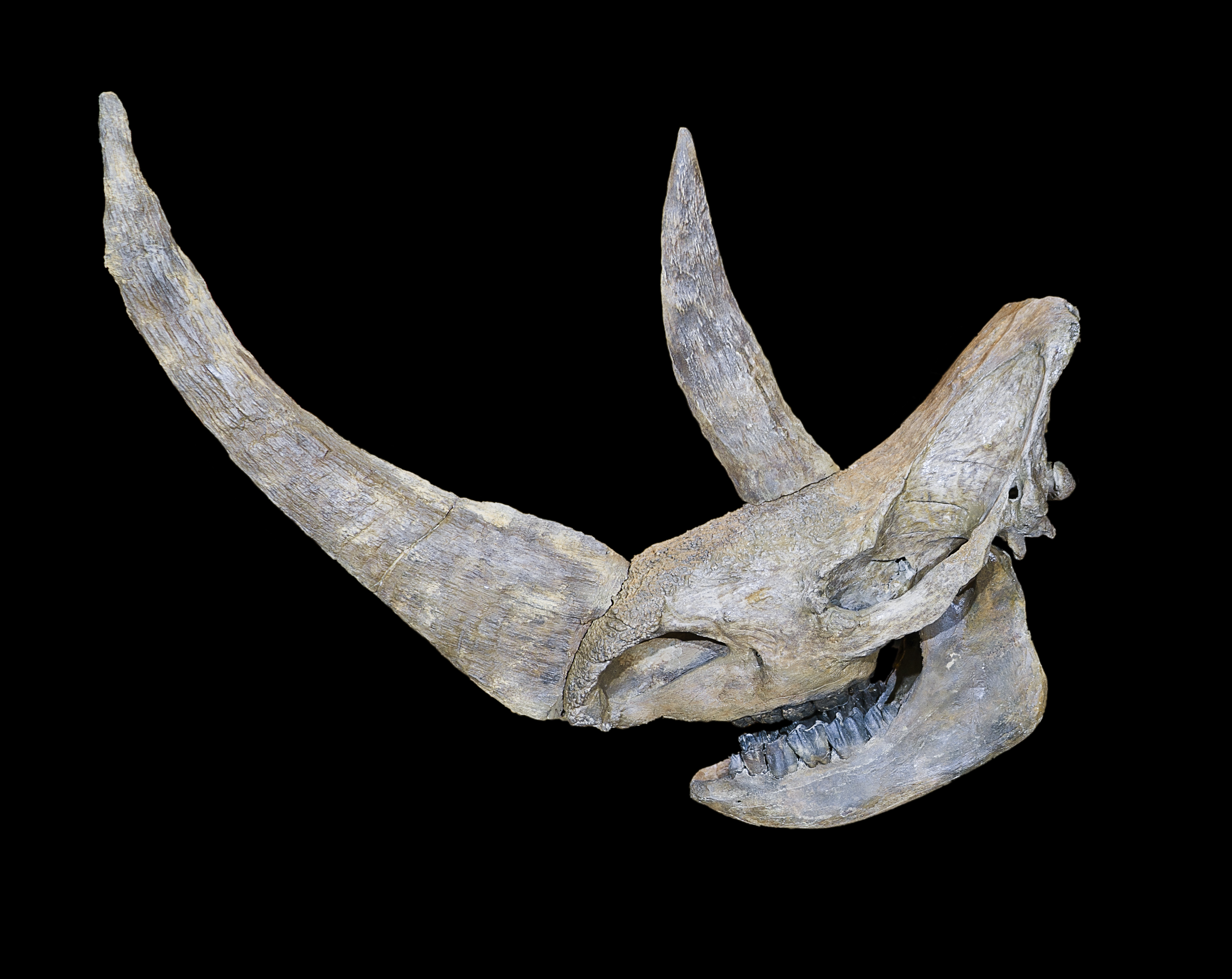
Woolly rhinoceros skull

The skull had a length between 70 and 90 cm (30 and 35 in). It was longer than those of other rhinoceros, giving the head a deep, downward-facing slanting position, similar to its fossil relative Stephanorhinus hemitoechus and Elasmotherium as well as the white rhinoceros. Strong muscles on its long occipital bone formed its neck hock and held the massive skull. Its massive lower jaw measured up to 60 cm (24 in) long and 10 cm (4 in) high. The teeth of the woolly rhinoceros had thickened enamel and an open internal cavity. Like other rhinos, adults did not have incisors. It had 3 premolars and 3 molars in both jaws. The molars were high-crowned and had a thick coat of cementum.

Both males and females had two horns which were made of keratin, with one long nasal horn at the front of the skull reaching forward and a smaller posterior frontal horn between the eyes. The nasal horn would have typically measured 1–1.35 metres (3.3–4.4 ft) long for individuals at 25 to 35 years of age, while the frontal horn would have measured up to 47.5 centimetres (1.56 ft) long, with the mass of measured woolly rhinoceros nasal horns varing from 2.5 to 11.4 kilograms (5.5 to 25.1 lb), with an average mass of 6 kilograms (13 lb). The longest nasal horn ever recorded is 164.7 centimetres (5.40 ft) long measured along the curvature. Unlike in modern rhinos, the large nasal horn was often flattened in cross-section, and abrasion patterns on the horn indicate its possible use in brushing away snow when grazing.

The nasal septum of the woolly rhinoceros was ossified, unlike modern rhinos. This was most common in adult males. This adaptation probably evolved as a result of the heavy pressure on the horn and face when the rhinoceros grazed underneath the thick snow. Unique to this rhino, the nasal bones were fused to the premaxillae, which is not the case in older Coelodonta types or today's rhinoceroses. This ossification inspired the junior synonym specific name tichorhinus, from Greek τειχος (teikhos) "wall", ῥις (ῥιν-) (rhis (rhin-)) "nose".

=== External appearance ===
Frozen specimens indicate that the woolly rhino's long fur coat was brown in adults and light brown in juveniles, with a thick undercoat that lay under a layer of long, coarse guard hair thickest on the withers and neck. Shorter hair covered the limbs, keeping snow from attaching. The body's length ended with a 45-to-50-centimetre (18 to 20 in) tail with a brush of coarse hair at the end. Females had two nipples on the udders.

The woolly rhinoceros had several features which reduced the body's surface area and minimized heat loss. Its ears were no longer than 24 cm (9 1/2 in), while those of rhinos in hot climates are about 30 cm (12 in). Their tails were also relatively shorter. It also had thick skin, ranging from 5 to 15 mm (1/4 to 5/8 in), heaviest on the chest and shoulders. Beneath the skin, the body was covered in a layer of subcutaneous fat, ranging from 1.5–3 centimetres (0.59–1.18 in) thick on the chest, to 1–1.5 centimetres (0.39–0.59 in) on the lower jaw and the posterior part of the back.

== Paleobiology and palaeoecology ==
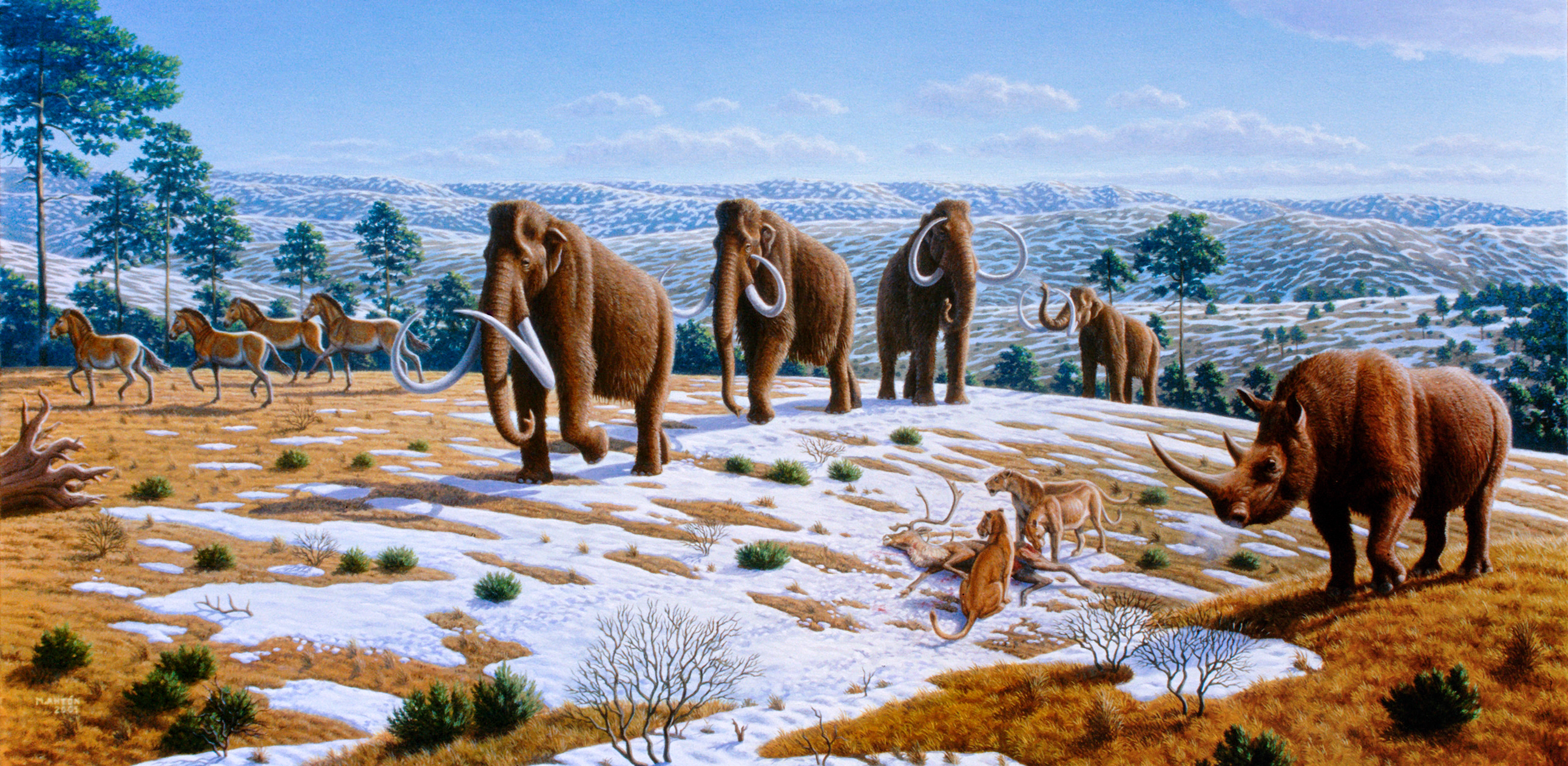
Woolly rhinoceros (right), alongside woolly mammoths, wild horses and cave lions with a reindeer carcass during the Last Glacial Period in northern Spain, by Mauricio Antón

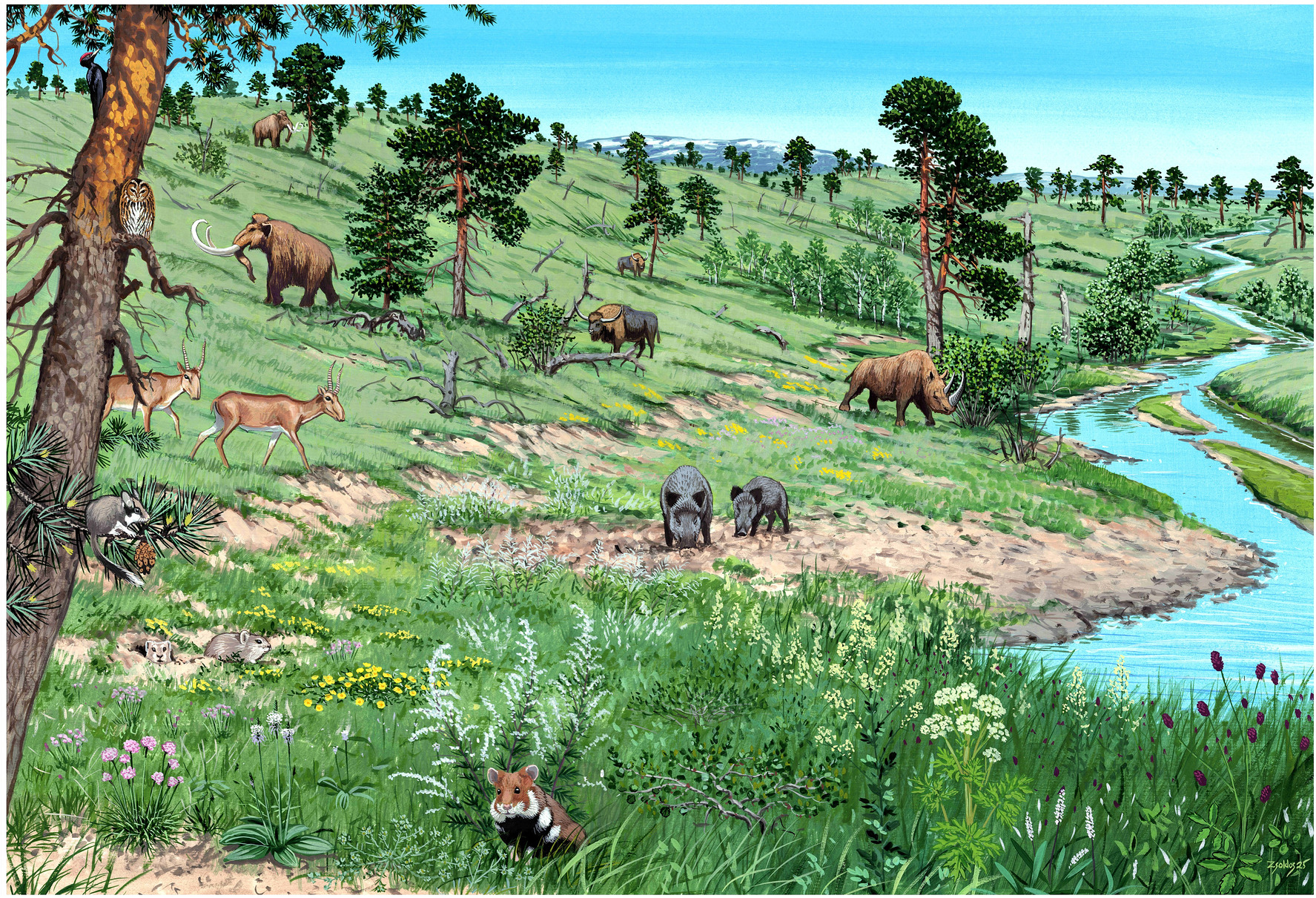
Woolly rhinoceros (background right) in a Last Glacial Period Central European landscape scene, along with saiga antelope, woolly mammoth, steppe bison, wild boar, European hamster, garden dormouse, black woodpecker and tawny owl.

The woolly rhinoceros had a similar life history to modern rhinos. Studies on milk teeth show that individuals developed similarly to both the white and black rhinoceros. The two teats in the female suggest that she raised one calf, or more rarely two, every two to three years.

With their massive horns and size, adults had few predators, but young individuals could have been killed and consumed by predators such as cave hyenas and cave lions. A skull from the Volga region of Russia was found with trauma suggested to have been inflicted by a cave lion when it was a juvenile, but the animal survived to adulthood. Remains of woolly rhinoceros are frequently found in cave hyena dens with gnaw marks indicating that their remains were consumed by them, which to a large degree likely reflects scavenging of the carcasses of already dead rhinoceroses. A piece of juvenile woolly rhinoceros skin with blond fur (possibly representing that of a calf) was recovered from the stomach content of two frozen juvenile female Pleistocene wolves, which was inferred to be part of the wolves' last meal.

Woolly rhinos may have used their horns for combat, probably including intraspecific combat as recorded in cave paintings, as well as for moving snow to uncover vegetation during winter. They may have also been used to attract mates. Bull woolly rhinos were probably territorial like their modern counterparts, defending themselves from competitors, particularly during the rutting season. Fossil skulls indicate damage from the front horns of other rhinos, and lower jaws and back ribs show signs of being broken and re-formed, which may have also come from fighting. The apparent frequency of intraspecific combat, compared to recent rhinos, was likely a result of rapid climatic change during the last glacial period, when the animal faced increased stress from competition with other large herbivores.

=== Diet ===
Woolly rhinoceroses mostly fed on grasses and sedges that grew in the mammoth steppe. Its long, slanted head with a downward-facing posture, and tooth structure all helped it graze on vegetation. It had a wide upper lip like that of the white rhinoceros, which allowed it to easily pluck vegetation directly from the ground. A strain vector biomechanical investigation of the skull, mandible and teeth of a well-preserved last cold stage individual recovered from Whitemoor Haye, Staffordshire, revealed musculature and dental characteristics that support a grazing feeding preference. In particular, the enlargement of the temporalis and neck muscles is consistent with that required to resist the large tugging forces generated when taking large mouthfuls of fodder from the ground. The presence of a large diastema supports this theory. Comparisons with living perissodactyls confirm that the woolly rhinoceros was a hindgut fermentor with a single stomach, consuming cellulose-rich, protein-poor fodder. It had to consume a heavy amount of food to account for the low nutritive content of its diet. Woolly rhinos living in the Arctic during the Last Glacial Maximum consumed approximately equal volumes of forbs, such as Artemisia, and graminoids. Pollen analysis shows it also ate woody plants (including conifers, willows and alders), along with flowers, forbs and mosses. Isotope studies on horns show that the woolly rhinoceros had a seasonal diet; different areas of horn growth suggest that it mainly grazed in summer, while it browsed for shrubs and branches in the winter. Dental mesowear measurements further show that the woolly rhinoceros's diet was heavily composed on abrasive grasses.

=== Growth and pathologies ===
An adult female discovered in Yakutia suggests that it could have had a lifespan of about 40 years or more, similar to that of its modern relatives. The adult male fossil found in Altai (specimen AMBU n349) lived to be over 35 years old. In 2014, Shpansky analysed the growth of woolly rhinoceros from its early life stages based on several lower jaw fragments and limb bones. A one-month-old calf was about 1.2 metres (3.9 ft) in length and 72 centimetres (2.36 ft) tall at the shoulder. The most intensive growth in woolly rhinos occurred during the juvenile stage around 3 to 4 years of age with a shoulder height of 1.3 metres (4.3 ft). At 7 to 10 years of age, woolly rhinos became young adults with a shoulder height of 1.4–1.5 metres (4.6–4.9 ft). By more than 14 years of age, woolly rhinos became fully mature, old adults with a shoulder height of 1.6 metres (5.2 ft).

C. antiquitatis individuals of old age display extensive wear and loss of their anterior premolars as a result of tooth abrasion from their intensive grazing lifestyle.

=== Habitat and distribution ===
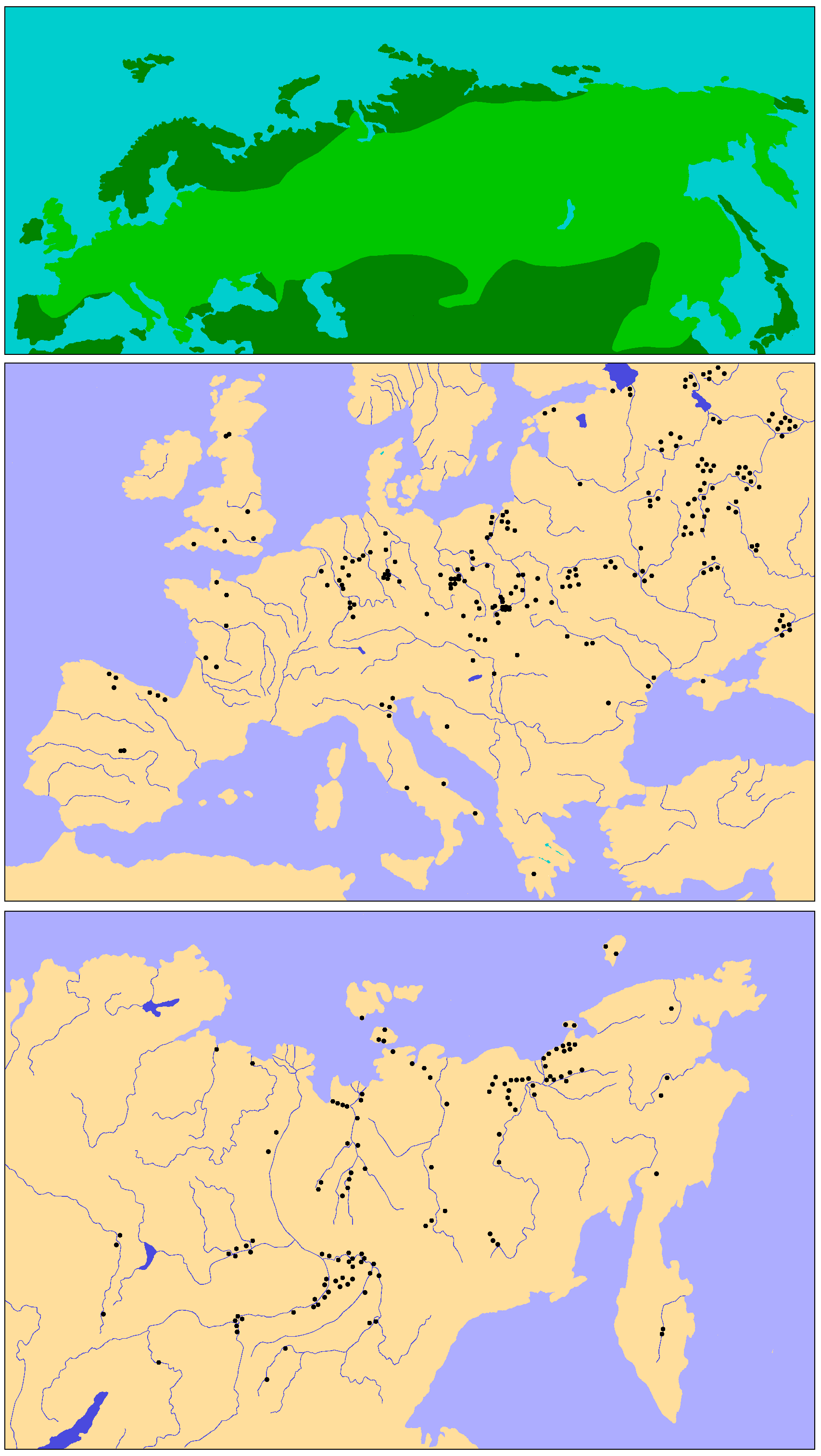
Range of the woolly rhinoceros, including sites of fossils

The woolly rhinoceros lived mainly in lowlands, plateaus and river valleys, with dry to arid climates, and migrated to higher elevations in favourable climate phases. It avoided mountain ranges, due to heavy snow and steep terrain that the animal could not easily cross. The rhino's main habitat was the mammoth steppe, a large, open landscape covered with wide ranges of grass and bushes. The woolly rhinoceros lived alongside other large herbivores, such as the woolly mammoth, giant deer, reindeer, saiga antelope and bison – an assortment of animals known as the Mammuthus-Coelodonta Faunal Complex. The woolly rhinoceros had a greater tolerance of warmer environments than other members of the Mammuthus-Coelodonta Faunal Complex. With its wide distribution, the woolly rhinoceros lived in some areas alongside the other rhinoceroses Stephanorhinus and Elasmotherium. The Altai and possibly the Russian Far East are likely to have served as refugia during unfavourable warm interglacial periods.

By the end of the Riss glaciation about 130,000 years ago, the woolly rhinoceros lived throughout northern Eurasia, spanning most of Europe, the Russian Plain, Siberia, and the Mongolian Plateau, ranging to extremes of 72° to 33°N. Fossils have been found as far north as the New Siberian Islands. Even during the very warm Eemian interglacial, the range of the woolly rhinoceros extended into temperate regions such as Poland. It had the widest range of any rhinoceros species.

It seemingly did not cross the Bering land bridge during the last ice age (which connected Asia to North America), with its easterly-most occurrence at the Chukotka Peninsula, probably due to the low grass density and lack of suitable habitat in the Yukon combined with competition from other large herbivores on the frigid land bridge.

== Relationship with humans ==
=== Hunting ===
Paired δ^{13}C and δ^{1}^{5}N measurements of fossils from Les Pradelles indicate that woolly rhinoceroses made up a significant proportion of the diet of the local Neanderthal population.

Woolly rhinoceroses shared their habitat with modern humans, but direct evidence that they interacted is relatively rare. Only 11% of the known sites of prehistoric Siberian tribes have remains or images of the animal. Many rhinoceros remains are found in caves (such as the Kůlna Cave in Central Europe), which were not the natural habitat of either rhinos or humans, and large predators such as hyenas may have carried rhinoceros parts there. Sometimes, only individual teeth or bone fragments are uncovered, which usually came from only one animal. Most rhinoceros remains in Western Europe are found in the same places where human remains or artifacts were found, but this may have occurred naturally.

Signs that early humans hunted or scavenged the rhinoceros come from markings on the animal's bones. One specimen had injuries caused by human weaponry, with traces of a wound from a sharp object marking the shoulder and thigh, and a preserved spear was found near the carcass. A few sites from the early phase of the Last Glacial Period in the late Middle Paleolithic, such as the Gudenus Cave (Austria) and the open air site of Königsaue (Saxony-Anhalt, Germany), have heavily beaten rhinoceros bones lined with slash marks. This action was done partly to extract the nutritious bone marrow.

Both horns and bones of the rhinoceros were used as raw materials for tools and weapons, as were remains from other animals. In what is now Zwoleń, Poland, a device was made from a battered woolly rhinoceros pelvis. Half-meter spear throwers, made from a woolly rhinoceros horn about 27,000 years ago, came from the Yana Rhinoceros Horn Site on the banks of the Yana River. A 13,300-year-old spear found on Bolshoy Lyakhovsky Island has a tip made of rhinoceros horn, the furthest north a human artifact has ever been found.

=== Ancient art ===
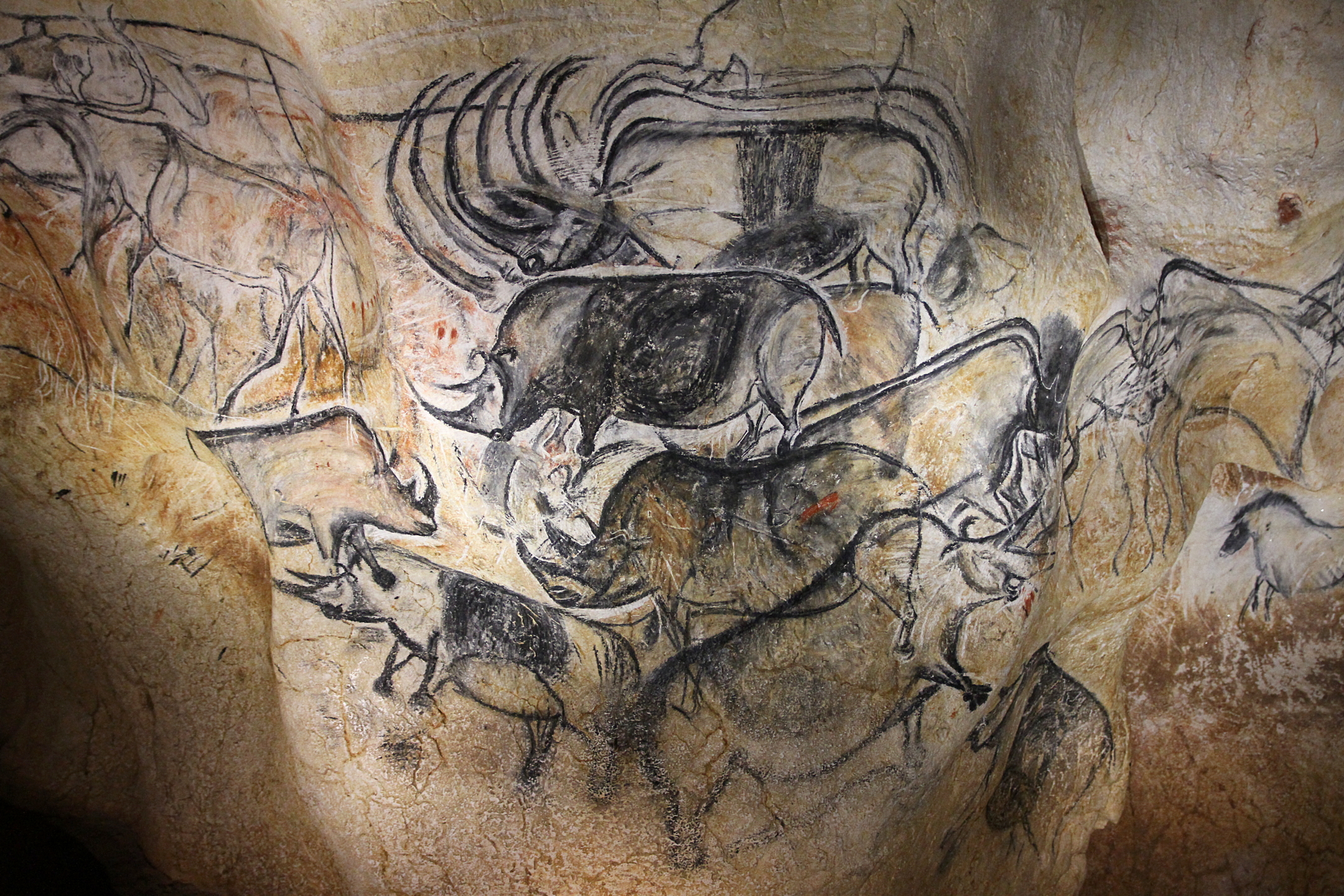
Cave paintings in Chauvet Cave

Many cave paintings from the Upper Paleolithic depict woolly rhinoceroses. The animal's defining features are prominently drawn, complete with the raised back and hump, contrasting with its low-lying head. Two curved lines represent the ears. The animal's horns are drawn with their long curvature, and in some cases, the coat is also indicated. Many paintings show a black band dividing the body.

About 20 Paleolithic drawings of woolly rhinos were known before the discovery of the Chauvet Cave in France. They are dated at over 31,000 years old, probably from the Aurignacian, engraved on cave walls or drawn in red or black. One scene depicts two rhinos fighting each other with their horns. Other illustrations are found in the Rouffignac and Lascaux caves. One drawing from Font-de-Gaume shows a noticeably higher head posture, and others were drawn in red pigments in the Kapova Cave in the Ural Mountains. Some images show rhinoceroses struck with spears or arrows, signifying human hunting.

The site of Dolní Věstonice in Moravia, Czech Republic, was found with more than seven hundred statuettes of animals, many of woolly rhinoceroses.

The Pinhole Cave Man is a late Paleolithic figure of a man engraved on a rib bone of a woolly rhinoceros, found at Creswell Crags in England.

== Extinction ==
Prior to its extinction, the woolly rhinoceros had survived several prior glacial-interglacial cycles, including the Eemian/Last Interglacial (~130-115,000 years ago), which was comparable in warmth to the present Holocene epoch. Genetic evidence suggests that the population of woolly rhinoceros substantially declined during this period, though sizeable habitat able to support woolly rhinoceros populations remained in central Eurasia from the Urals to the Altai despite the warmth of this period, and woolly rhinoceroses are known to have inhabited habitats considerably warmer than it is typically associated with during this period, such as the Neumark-Nord locality in central Germany, where it occurs alongside temperate-adapted fauna.

Analysis of the nuclear genome suggests that the woolly rhinoceros experienced a population expansion beginning around 30,000 years ago. The end of the last glacial period shows a progressive contraction of the range of the woolly rhinoceros, with the species disappearing from Europe during the interval between 17 and 15,000 years ago, with its youngest confirmed reliable records obtained from bones being from the Urals, dating to 14,200 years ago, and northeast Siberia, dating to around 14,000 years ago. The youngest records of the species coincide with the onset of the Bølling–Allerød warming (which began around 14,700 years ago), which likely resulted in increased precipitation (including snowfall), which transformed the woolly rhinoceros' preferred low-growing grass and herb habitat into one dominated by shrubs and trees. Apparent later radiocarbon dates obtained from other fossils have been considered questionable.^{(see supplementary material)} The woolly rhinoceros was likely intolerant of deep snow, which its short limbs were inefficient in moving through. Population fragmentation is likely to have played a role in its extinction. The presence of large numbers of abnormal cervical ribs in specimens from the North Sea, much higher than that found in living rhinoceroses, may have been the result of inbreeding due to low population size or harsh environmental conditions.

A genetic study of the woolly rhinoceros remains in northeast Siberia, dating to around 18,500 years ago, a few thousand years before its extinction, found that the population size was stable and relatively large, despite long-term co-existence with humans in the region. A specimen of 14,400-year old woolly rhinoceros muscle tissue found preserved in a permafrost-frozen juvenile wolf's stomach in the Tumat region of far north-northeastern Siberia, which represents among the youngest specimens of the species, had a similar level of genetic diversity to the 18,500-year old specimen, implying that the woolly rhinoceros population in the region was stable up until a likely rapid decline during the Bølling–Allerød warming. A Holocene survival of the species has been suggested by the finding of environmental DNA of the woolly rhinoceros in sediments of the Kolyma region of Northeast Siberia dating to 9,800 ± 200 years ago. However, it has been demonstrated that ancient DNA in permafrost can be reworked into sediment layers dating to well after the extinction of the originating species, though other authors have argued that this specific environmental DNA record is unlikely to have been reworked. Low level human hunting (~10% of every woolly rhinoceros generation) may have played a decisive role in the extinction by reducing the ability of woolly rhinoceros populations to colonise newly suitable habitat, thereby exacerbating the population fragmentation brought on by environmental change.

The extinction of the woolly rhinoceros formed part of the broader end-Pleistocene extinction event spanning from the latter Late Pleistocene to the beginning of the Holocene, where most terrestrial megafauna (large animals) became extinct, including 80% of those over 1 tonne. As with the woolly rhinoceros, humans and climatic factors are thought to have been the primary cause of the extinctions.

== Frozen specimens ==
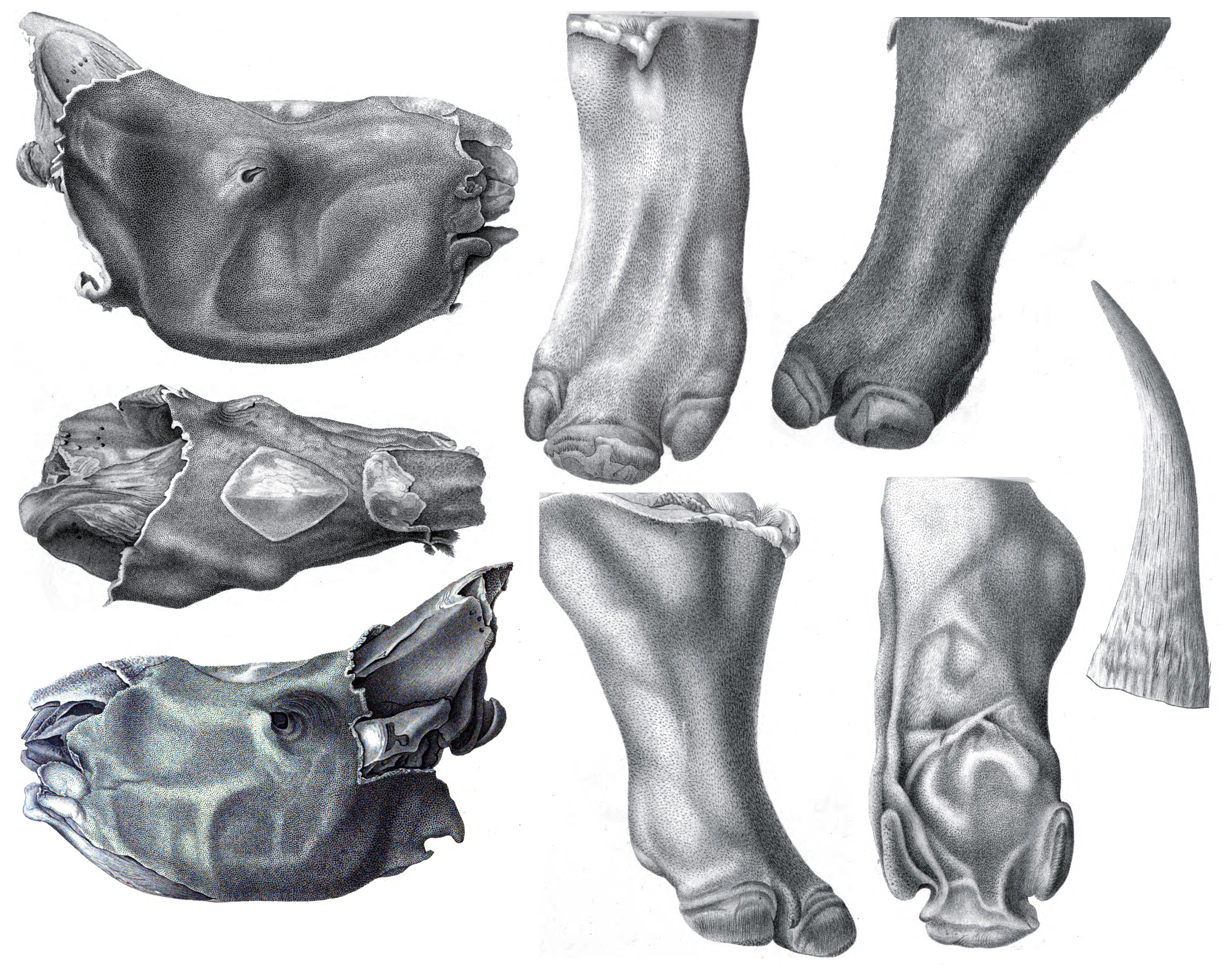
Mummified remains discovered in 1771

Many rhinoceros remains have been found preserved in the permafrost region. In 1771, a head, two legs and hide were found in the Vilyuy River in eastern Siberia and sent to the Kunstkamera in Saint Petersburg. Later in 1877, a Siberian trader recovered a head and one leg from a tributary of the Yana River.

In October 1907, miners in Starunia, now Ukraine, found a mammoth carcass buried in an ozokerite pit. A month later, a rhinoceros was found 5 metres (15 ft) underneath. Both were sent to the Dzieduszycki Museum, where a detailed description was published in the museum's monograph. Photographs were published in paleontological journals and textbooks, and the first modern paintings of the species were based on the mounted specimen. The rhino is now located in the Lviv National Museum along with the mammoth. Later, in 1929, the Polish Academy of Arts and Sciences sent an expedition to Starunia, finding the mummified remains of three rhinos. One specimen, missing only its horns and fur, was taken to the Aquarium and Natural History Museum in Kraków. A plaster cast was made soon afterwards, which is now held in the Natural History Museum in London.

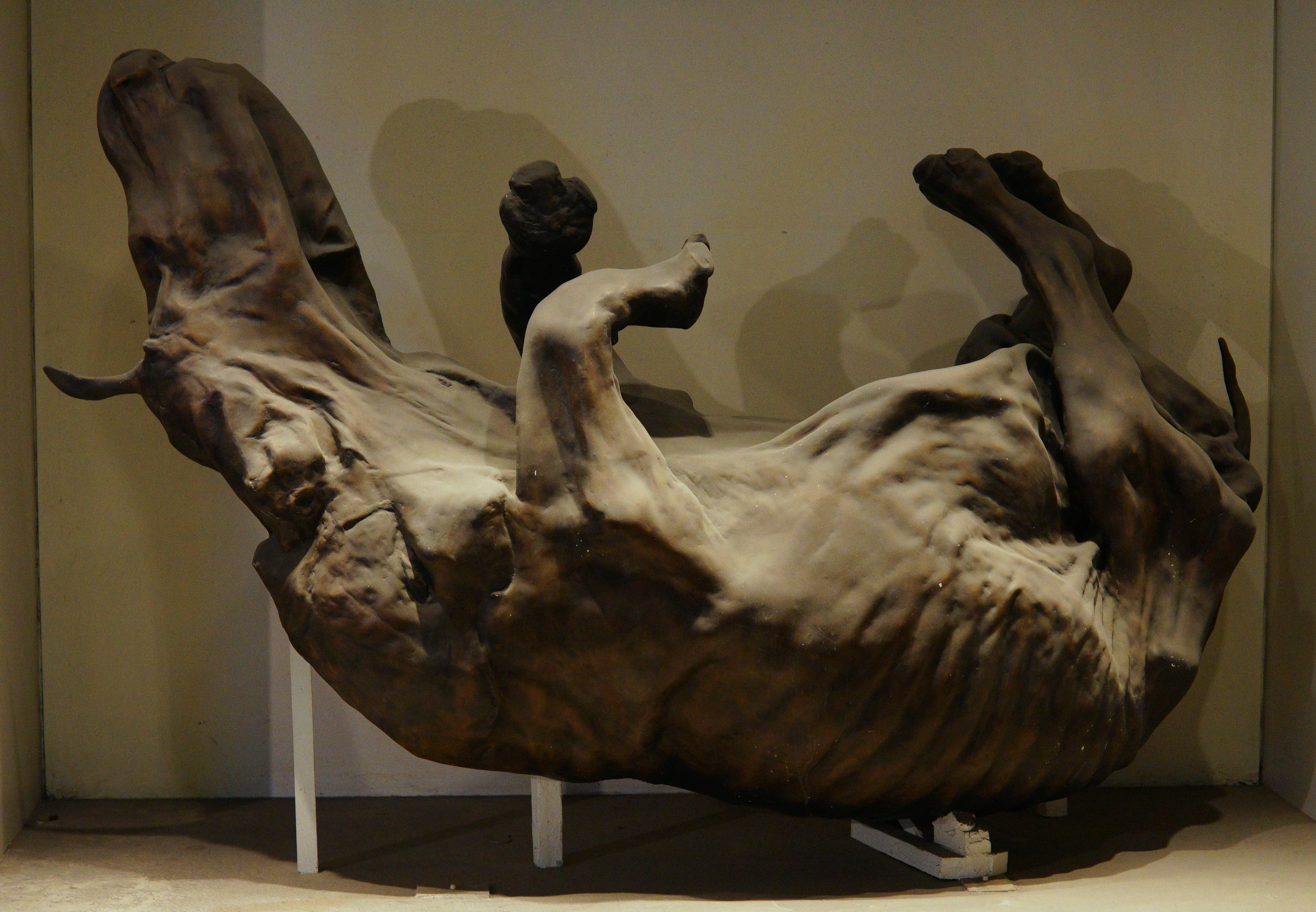
Cast of the mummified Starunia specimen, Natural History Museum, London

Skull and rib fragments of a rhinoceros were found in 1972 in Churapcha, between the Lena and Amga rivers. A whole skeleton was found soon afterwards, with preserved skin, fur, and stomach contents. In 1976, schoolchildren on a class trip found a 20,000-year-old rhinoceros skeleton on the Aldan River's left bank, uncovering a skull with both horns, a spine, ribs and limb bones.

In 2007, a partial rhinoceros carcass was found in the lower reaches of the Kolyma river. Its upward-facing position indicates that the animal probably fell into mud and sank. Next year in 2008, a nearly complete skeleton came from the Chukochya River. That same year, locals near the Amga discovered mummified rhinoceros remains, and over the next two years, pelvic bones, tail vertebrae and ribs were excavated along with forelimbs and hind limbs with toes intact.

In September 2014, a mummified young rhinoceros was discovered by two hunters, Alexander "Sasha" Banderov and Simeon Ivanov, at a tributary of the Semyulyakh River in the Abyysky District in Yakutia, Russia. Its head and horns, fur, and soft tissues were recovered. Some parts had been thawed and eaten since they were not covered by permafrost. The body was handed over to the Yakutia Academy of Sciences, where it was named "Sasha" after one of its discoverers. Dental analysis shows that the calf was about seven months old at the time of its death. With its well-intact preservation, scientists proceeded to undertake DNA analysis.

In August 2020, a rhinoceros was found, after being revealed by melting permafrost, close to the site of the 2014 discovery. The rhino was between three and four years old and it is thought that the cause of death was drowning. It is one of the best-preserved animals recovered from the region, having most of its internal organs intact. The discovery was also notable for the preservation of a small nasal horn, a rarity as these normally decompose quickly.

== See also ==
- Elasmotherium, another Pleistocene Eurasian rhinoceros
- Narrow-nosed rhinoceros, temperate adapted rhinoceros species native to Europe, the Middle East and North Africa during Middle-Late Pleistocene
- Stephanorhinus kirchbergensis also known as Merck's rhinoceros, temperate adapted rhinoceros species native to Europe and Asia during Middle-Late Pleistocene
