= Aquarium and Natural History Museum, Kraków =

Aquarium and Natural History Museum in Kraków
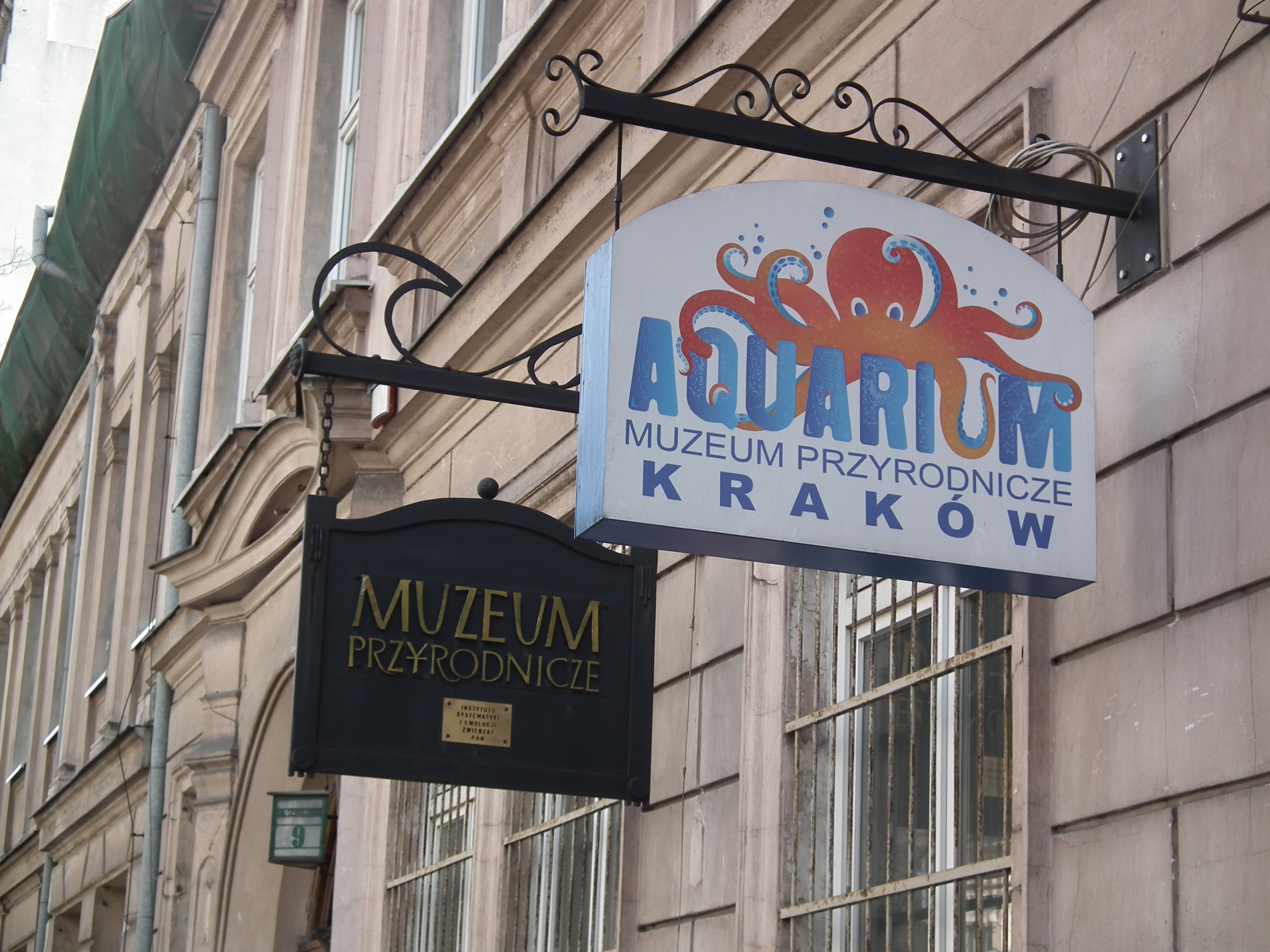
- Aquarium signs
- Interactive map of Aquarium and Natural History Museum in Kraków
- 50.0554814°N 19.9414552°E
- Date opened: 1888
- Location: Kraków, Poland

Aquarium and Natural History Museum in Kraków (formerly the Museum of Natural Science Institute of Systematics and Evolution of Animals PAS) is a public aquarium and museum at St. Sebastian 9th in Kraków, Poland. There is a crafted, perfectly preserved, prehistoric woolly rhinoceros, the only completely preserved specimen of this animal that went extinct more than 12 thousand years ago.

== History ==
The origins of the museum were in 1865 when Kazimierz Wodzicki gathered a collection of birds gave the Scientific Society of Kraków. Originally housed in the building of the Cracow branch of Academy of Sciences, ul. Sławkowska. In 1888, he arranged the first exhibition to the public. In 1929 the museum was enriched by a unique specimen of woolly rhinoceros found in the village of Starunia, near Stanisławow. The Museum moved to current premises in 1993.

In the museum, there were four permanent exhibitions: "Molluscs", "Conversation with a stone", "Amber in science and kolekcjonerstwie.", "Polish Pleistocene fauna." There were also temporary exhibitions. One of the major temporary exhibitions, the museum organized in 2004, was called. Mobile Aquarium circulating in Poland which enjoyed enormous popularity among the visitors.

In August 2009, the Museum of Natural Sciences ISEZ was initially closed to visitors until further notice and then transformed into the so-called temporary living museum. Currently, the building houses the Aquarium and the Natural History Museum in Kraków, an educational interactive exhibit.

Natural, zoological and geological collections of the museum are stored in a warehouse, and museum management, along with the city is looking for a new headquarters for the museum (it will probably be one of the forts of Cracow). Currently, the Museum of Natural Sciences ISEZ based on their collections storage organizes temporary exhibitions on request from external entities (e.g. Geological Museum AGH).

== Exhibits ==
The core of the museum exhibition is exotarium and an aquarium. The organizational structure of exposure includes freshwater and marines aquariums. It also has exhibits rhinoceros, fossils, minerals.
