= Whitemore =

Whitemore may refer to:

- Whitemore, Staffordshire, a location in England
- Whitemore, Tasmania, Australia
- Hugh Whitemore (1936–2018), English playwright and screenwriter

== See also ==
- Whitemoor (disambiguation)
