= Whitemoor Haye =

Coordinates: 52.7144°N 1.7350°W

Whitemoor Haye (grid reference SK1813) is a mainly agricultural area in the floodplain of the River Tame, near Alrewas in Staffordshire, England.

It is very popular with birdwatchers, as several rare species are either resident or seasonal visitors, notably the corn bunting.

The remains of several woolly rhinoceroses were recovered from a quarry here in 2002.

There is an airfield, for light aircraft such as microlights.

== Nearby ==
- A38
- Croxall Lakes (Staffordshire Wildlife Trust)
- National Memorial Arboretum
