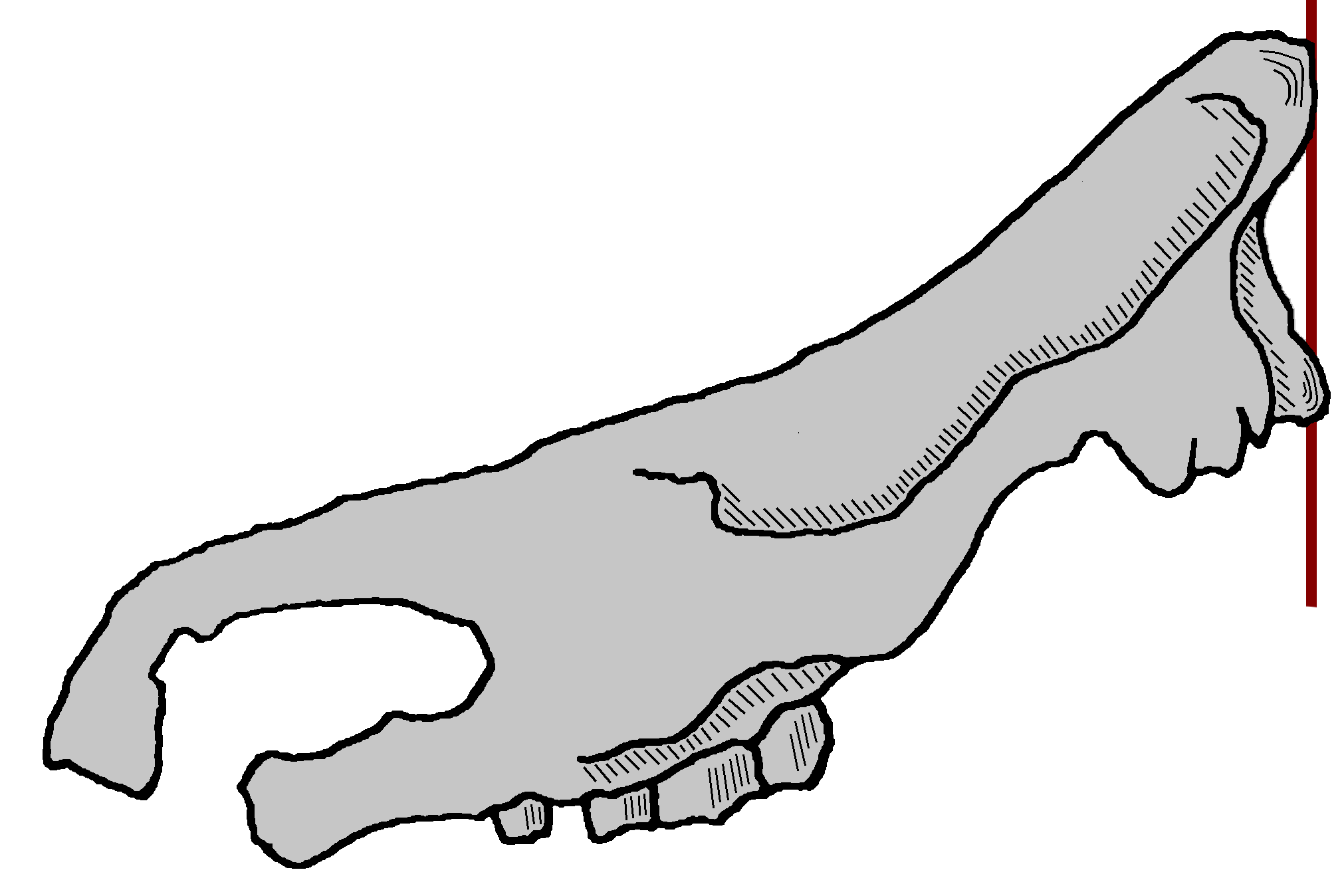
- Drawing of a C. tologoijensis skull

Scientific classification
- Domain: Eukaryota
- Kingdom: Animalia
- Phylum: Chordata
- Class: Mammalia
- Order: Perissodactyla
- Family: Rhinocerotidae
- Genus: †Coelodonta
- Species: †C. tologoijensis

Binomial name
- †Coelodonta tologoijensis Beliajeva, 1966

= Coelodonta tologoijensis =

Coelodonta tologoijensis Temporal range: Early Pleistocene–Middle Pleistocene

Extinct species of mammal

Coelodonta tologoijensis is an extinct species of rhinoceros belonging to the genus Coelodonta, related to the woolly rhinoceros. It is known from fossils found in Siberia and Mongolia, dating from the Early Pleistocene to Middle Pleistocene. One skull found in the Kyffhauser hills near the town of Bad Frankenhausen, Germany, dating to approximately 450,000 years was formerly assigned to the species by researchers, which would have made it the earliest known member of Coelodonta in Europe, However, a 2022 study refuted the assignment of the Bad Frankenhausen skull to C. tologoijensis, interpreting it as the skull of the woolly rhinoceros (Coelodonta antiquitatis) instead, meaning that the species is currently confined to Asia.
