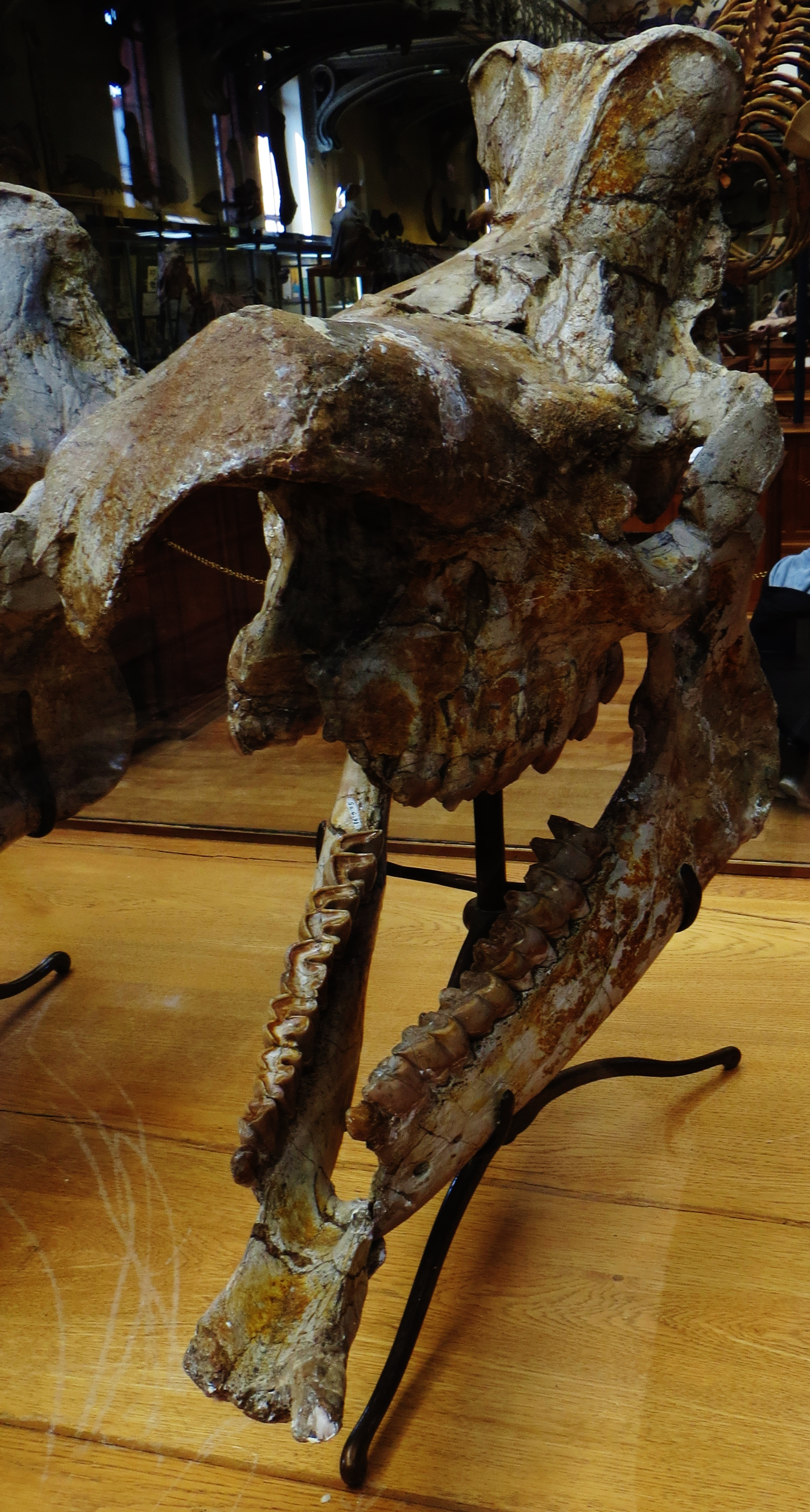
- Lartetotherium sansaniense skull

Scientific classification
- Kingdom: Animalia
- Phylum: Chordata
- Class: Mammalia
- Order: Perissodactyla
- Family: Rhinocerotidae
- Genus: †Lartetotherium; Ginsburg, 1974
- Species: †L. sansaniense

Binomial name
- †Lartetotherium sansaniense Ginsburg, 1974

Synonyms
- Dicerorhinus sansaniensis

= Lartetotherium =

Lartetotherium Temporal range: Miocene

Extinct genus of mammal

Lartetotherium is an extinct genus of rhinocerotid that lived during the Miocene in Europe and possibly China.

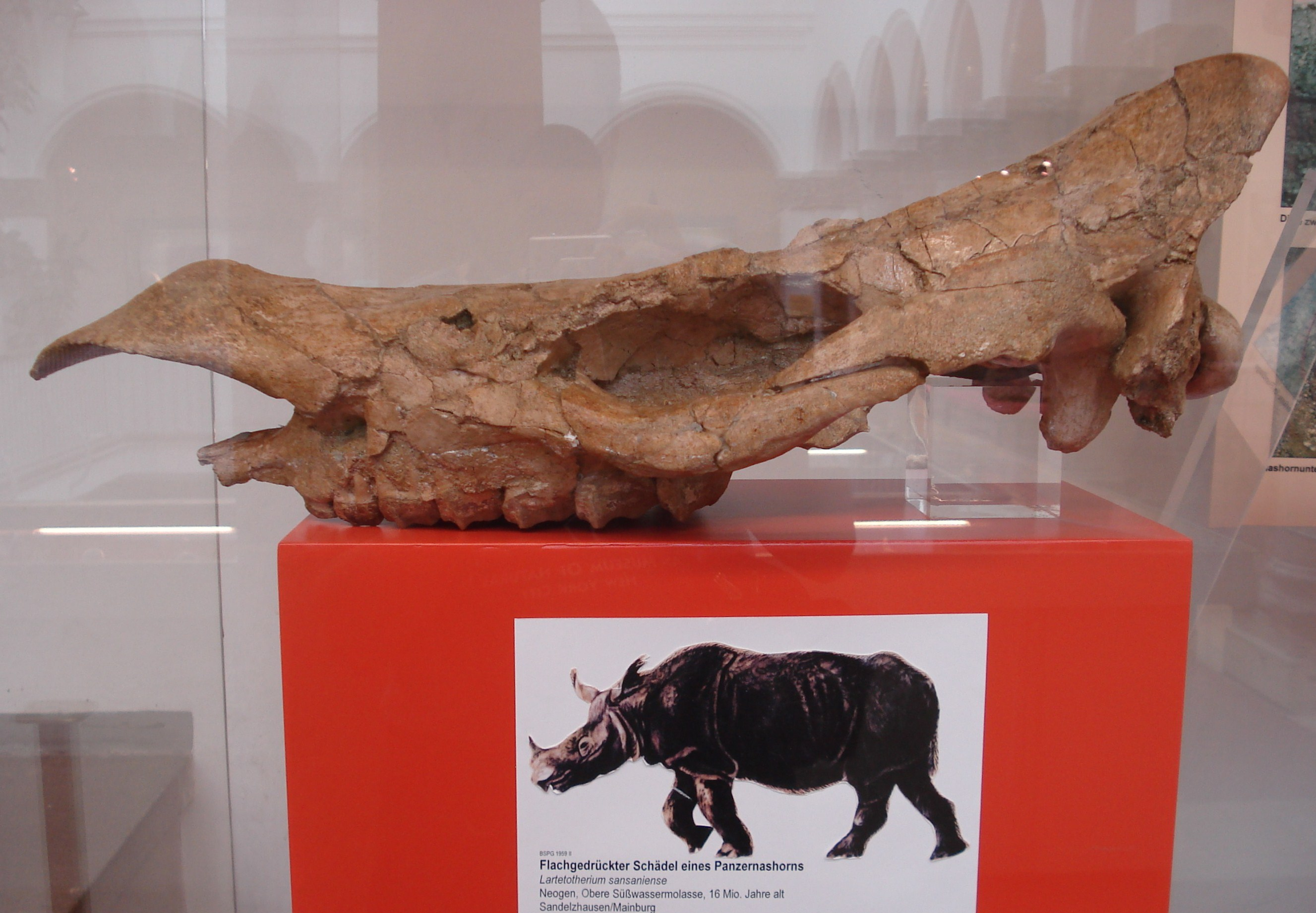
Skull

The type species Lartetotherium sansaniense was a unique cursorial rhinoceros with a distinctly long horn. Its teeth were brachyodont, indicating its diet contained a high quantity of soft plants and a lower proportion of woody material.

A 2023 study reassigned the species Dicerorhinus cixianensis (Chen and Wu, 1976) from the Middle Miocene of Cixian County, Hebei Province, China, to the genus. The species is known from a single partial skull and juvenile mandible, notably small in size.

== Palaeoecology ==
Analysis of δ^{18}O and δ^{13}C values suggests that L. sansaniense was an inhabitant of relatively open environments.
