= List of biomolecules =

This is a list of articles that describe particular biomolecules or types of biomolecules.

== A ==
For substances with an A- or α- prefix such as α-amylase, please see the parent page (in this case Amylase).

- A23187 (Calcimycin, Calcium Ionophore)
- Abamectine
- Abietic acid
- Acetic acid
- Acetylcholine
- Actin
- Actinomycin D
- Adenine
- Adenosine
- Adenosine diphosphate (ADP)
- Adenosine monophosphate (AMP)
- Adenosine triphosphate (ATP)
- Adenylate cyclase
- Adiponectin
- Adonitol
- Adrenaline, epinephrine
- Adrenocorticotropic hormone (ACTH)
- Aequorin
- Aflatoxin
- Agar
- Alamethicin
- Alanine
- Albumins
- Aldosterone
- Aleurone
- Alpha-amanitin
- Alpha-MSH (Melaninocyte stimulating hormone)
- Allantoin
- Allethrin
- α-Amanatin, see Alpha-amanitin
- Amino acid
- Amylase (also see α-amylase)
- Anabolic steroid
- Anandamide (ANA)
- Androgen
- Anethole
- Angiotensinogen
- Anisomycin
- Antidiuretic hormone (ADH)
- Anti-Müllerian hormone (AMH)
- Antioxidant
- Arabinose
- Arginine
- Argonaute
- Ascomycin
- Ascorbic acid (vitamin C)
- Asparagine
- Aspartic acid
- Asymmetric dimethylarginine
- ATP synthase
- Atrial-natriuretic peptide (ANP)
- Auxin
- Avidin
- Azadirachtin A – C_{35}H_{44}O_{16}

== B ==
- Bacteriocin
- Beauvericin
- beta-Hydroxy beta-methylbutyric acid
- beta-Hydroxybutyric acid
- Bicuculline
- Bilirubin
- Biopolymer
- Biotin (Vitamin H)
- Brefeldin A
- Brassinolide
- Brucine
- Butyric acid

== C ==
- Cadaverine
- Caffeine
- Calciferol (Vitamin D)
- Calcitonin
- Calmodulin
- Calreticulin
- Camphor - (C_{10}H_{16}O)
- Cannabinol - (C_{21}H_{26}O_{2})
- Capsaicin
- Carbohydrase
- Carbohydrate
- Carnitine
- Carrageenan
- Carotinoid
- Casein
- Caspase
- Catecholamine
- Cedramber
- Cellulase
- Cellulose - (C_{6}H_{10}O_{5})_{x}
- Cerulenin
- Cetrimonium bromide (Cetrimide) - C_{19}H_{42}BrN
- Chelerythrine
- Chromomycin A3
- Chaparonin
- Chitin
- α-Chloralose
- Chlorophyll
- Cholecystokinin (CCK)
- Cholesterol
- Choline
- Chondroitin sulfate
- Cinnamaldehyde
- Citral
- Citric acid
- Citrinin
- Citronellal
- Citronellol
- Citrulline
- Cobalamin (vitamin B_{12})
- Coenzyme
- Coenzyme Q
- Colchicine
- Collagen
- Coniine
- Corticosteroid
- Corticosterone
- Corticotropin-releasing hormone (CRH)
- Cortisol
- Creatine
- Creatine kinase
- Crystallin
- Cyclic adenosine monophosphate (cAMP)
- α-Cyclodextrin
- Cyclodextrin glycosyltransferase
- Cyclooxygenase
- Cyclopamine
- Cyclopiazonic acid
- Cysteine
- Cystine
- Cytidine
- Cytochalasin
- Cytochalasin E
- Cytochrome
- Cytochrome C
- Cytochrome c oxidase
- Cytochrome c peroxidase
- Cytokine
- Cytosine – C_{4}H_{5}N_{3}O

== D ==
- Dehydroepiandrosterone (DHEA)
- Deoxycholic acid
- DON (DeoxyNivalenol)
- Deoxyribofuranose
- Deoxyribose
- Deoxyribonucleic acid (DNA)
- Dextran
- Dextrin
- Dicer
- Dihydrotestosterone
- DNA
- DNA polymerase
- DNA ligase
- Dopamine

== E ==
- Endonuclease
- Enzyme
- Ephedrine
- Epinephrine – C_{9}H_{13}NO_{3}
- Erucic acid – CH_{3}(CH_{2})_{7}CH=CH(CH_{2})_{11}COOH
- Erythritol
- Erythropoietin (EPO)
- Estradiol
- Estriol
- Estrogen
- Estrone
- Eugenol
- Exonuclease

== F ==
- Fatty acid
- Ferredoxin
- Fibrin
- Fibronectin
- Flavin adenine dinucleotide (FAD)
- Folic acid (Vitamin M)
- Follicle stimulating hormone (FSH)
- Formaldehyde
- Formic acid
- Forskolin
- Fructose
- Fumonisin B1

== G ==
- Galactose
- Gangalioside
- Gamma globulin
- Gamma-aminobutyric acid
- Gamma-butyrolactone
- Gamma-hydroxybutyrate (GHB)
- Gastrin
- Gelatin
- Geraniol
- Ghrelin
- Globulin
- Glucagon
- Glucagon-like peptide 1
- Glucagon-like peptide 2
- Glucosamine
- Glucose – C_{6}H_{12}O_{6}
- Glucose oxidase
- Glutamic acid
- Glutamine
- Glutamate (neurotransmitter)
- Glutathione
- Gluten
- Glycan
- Glycerin (glycerol)
- Glycine
- Glycogen
- Glycogenin
- Glycogen synthase
- Glycogen phosphorylase
- Glycolic acid
- Glycolipid
- Glycoprotein
- Gonadotropin-releasing hormone (GnRH)
- Granzyme
- Green fluorescent protein
- Growth factor
- Growth hormone
- Growth hormone-releasing hormone (GHRH)
- GTPase
- Guanine
- Guanosine
- Guanosine triphosphate (+GTP)

== H ==
- Haptoglobin
- Helicase
- Hematoxylin
- Heme
- Hemerythrin
- Hemocyanin
- Hemoglobin
- Hemoprotein
- Heparan sulfate
- High density lipoprotein, HDL
- Histamine
- Histidine
- Histone
- Histone methyltransferase
- HLA antigen
- Homocysteine
- Hormone
- human chorionic gonadotropin (hCG)
- Human growth hormone
- Hyaluronate
- Hyaluronic acid
- Hyaluronidase
- Hydrogen peroxide
- 5-Hydroxymethylcytosine
- Hydroxyproline
- 5-Hydroxytryptamine

== I ==
- Indigo dye
- Indole
- Inosine
- Inositol
- Insulin
- Insulin-like growth factor
- Integral membrane protein
- Integrase
- Integrin
- Intein
- Interferon
- Interleukin
- Inulin
- Ionomycin
- Ionone
- Iron–sulfur cluster
- Isoleucine
- Isomerase
- Isoprene

== K ==
- K252a
- K252b
- KT5720
- KT5823
- Keratin
- Kinase
- Kisspeptin

== L ==
For substances with an l- or L- prefix such as L-alanine or DL-alanine, please see the parent page (in this case alanine).

- Lactase
- Lactic acid
- Lactose
- Lanolin
- Lauric acid
- Lectin
- Leptin
- Leptomycin B
- Leucine
- Leukotriene
- Ligase
- Lignin
- Limonene
- Linalool
- Linoleic acid
- Linolenic acid
- Lipase
- Lipid
- Lipid anchored protein
- Lipoamide
- Lipoprotein
- Low density lipoprotein, LDL
- Luteinizing hormone (LH)
- Lycopene
- Lysine
- Lysozyme

== M ==
- Malic acid
- Maltose
- Melanocyte- stimulating hormone (MSH)
- Melatonin
- Membrane protein
- Messenger RNA (mRNA)
- Metalloprotein
- Metallothionein
- Methionine
- Mimosine
- Mithramycin A
- Mitomycin C
- Monomer
- Morphine
- Mycophenolic acid
- Myoglobin
- Myosin

== N ==
- Natural phenols
- Neurotransmitters
- Neuropeptide Y
- Nicotinamide adenine dinucleotide (NAD)
- Norepinephrine
- Nucleic Acid
- Nucleosome
- Nucleoside
- Nucleotide

== O ==
- Ochratoxin A
- Oestrogens
- Oligopeptide
- Oligomycin
- Orcin
- Orexin
- Ornithine
- Oxalic acid
- Oxidase
- Oxytocin

== P ==
- p53
- PABA
- Paclitaxel
- Palmitic acid
- Pantothenic acid (vitamin B_{5})
- parathyroid hormone (PTH)
- Paraprotein
- Pardaxin
- Parthenolide
- Patulin
- Paxilline
- Penicillic acid
- Penicillin
- Penitrem A
- Peptidase
- Peptide YY (PYY)
- Pepsin
- Peptide
- Perimycin
- Peripheral membrane protein
- Perosamine
- Phenethylamine
- Phenylalanine
- Phosphagen
- phosphatase
- Phosphatidyl choline
- Phospholipid
- Phenylalanine
- Phytic acid
- Plant hormones
- Plasma protein
- Plastocyanin
- Polypeptide
- Polyphenols
- Polysaccharides
- Porphyrin
- Pranavylate Kinase Kinase
- Prion
- Progesterone
- Prolactin (PRL)
- Proline
- Propionic acid
- Prostaglandins
- Protamine
- Protease
- Proteasome
- Protein
- Proteinoid
- Purine
- Putrescine
- Pyrethrin
- Pyridoxine or pyridoxamine (Vitamin B6)
- Pyrimidine
- Pyrrolysine
- Pyruvic acid

== Q ==
- Quinidine
- Quinine
- Quinone

== R ==
- Radicicol
- Raffinose
- Relaxin
- Renin
- Retinene
- Retinol (Vitamin A)
- Reverse transcriptase
- Rhodopsin (visual purple)
- Riboflavin (vitamin B_{2})
- Ribofuranose, Ribose
- Ribozyme
- Ricin
- RNA - Ribonucleic acid
- RNA polymerase
- RuBisCO
- Ribosomal RNA

== S ==
- Safrole
- Salicylaldehyde
- Salicylic acid
- Salvinorin-A – C_{23}H_{28}O_{8}
- Saponin
- Secretin
- Selenocysteine
- Selenomethionine
- Selenoprotein
- Serine
- Serine kinase
- Serotonin
- Skatole
- Signal recognition particle
- Somatostatin
- Sorbic acid
- Sphingolipid
- Sphingosine
- Squalene
- Staurosporin
- Stearic acid
- Sterigmatocystin
- Sterol
- Strychnine
- Sucrose (sugar)
- Sugars (in general)
- superoxide

== T ==
- T2 Toxin
- Tannic acid
- Tannin
- Tartaric acid
- Taurine
- Tetrodotoxin
- Telomerase
- Thaumatin
- Topoisomerase
- Tyrosine kinase
- Testosterone
- Tetrahydrocannabinol (THC)
- Tetracycline
- Thapsigargin
- Thaumatin
- Thiamine (vitamin B_{1}) – C_{12}H_{17}ClN_{4}OS·HCl
- Threonine
- Thrombopoietin
- Thromboxane
- Thymidine
- Thymine
- Transfer RNA (tRNA)
- Triacsin C
- Thyroid-stimulating hormone (TSH)
- Thyrotropin-releasing hormone (TRH)
- Thyroxine (T4)
- Tocopherol (Vitamin E)
- Topoisomerase
- Triiodothyronine (T3)
- Transmembrane receptor
- Trichostatin A
- Trophic hormone
- Trypsin
- Tryptophan
- Tubulin
- Tunicamycin
- Tyrosine

== U ==
- Ubiquitin
- Uracil
- Urea
- Urease
- Uric acid – C_{5}H_{4}N_{4}O_{3}
- Uridine

== V ==
- Valine
- Valinomycin
- Vanabins
- Vasopressin
- Verruculogen
- Vitamins (in general)
- Vitamin A (retinol)
- Vitamin B
  - Vitamin B_{1} (thiamine)
  - Vitamin B_{2} (riboflavin)
  - Vitamin B_{3} (niacin or nicotinic acid)
  - Vitamin B_{4} (adenine)
  - Vitamin B_{5} (pantothenic acid)
  - Vitamin B_{6} (pyridoxine or pyridoxamine)
  - Vitamin B_{12} (cobalamin)
- Vitamin C (ascorbic acid)
- Vitamin D (calciferol)
- Vitamin E (tocopherol)
- Vitamin F
- Vitamin H (biotin)
- Vitamin K (naphthoquinone)
- Vitamin M (folic acid)

== W ==
- Water
- Wortmannin

== X ==
- Xanthophyll
- Xylose

== Y ==
- Yellow fluorescent protein

== Z ==
- Zearalenone

== See also ==
- Chemical compound
- Organic compound
- biochemistry

Similar lists

- List of compounds
- List of organic compounds
- List of proteins
