= Lestaurtinib =

Chemical compound

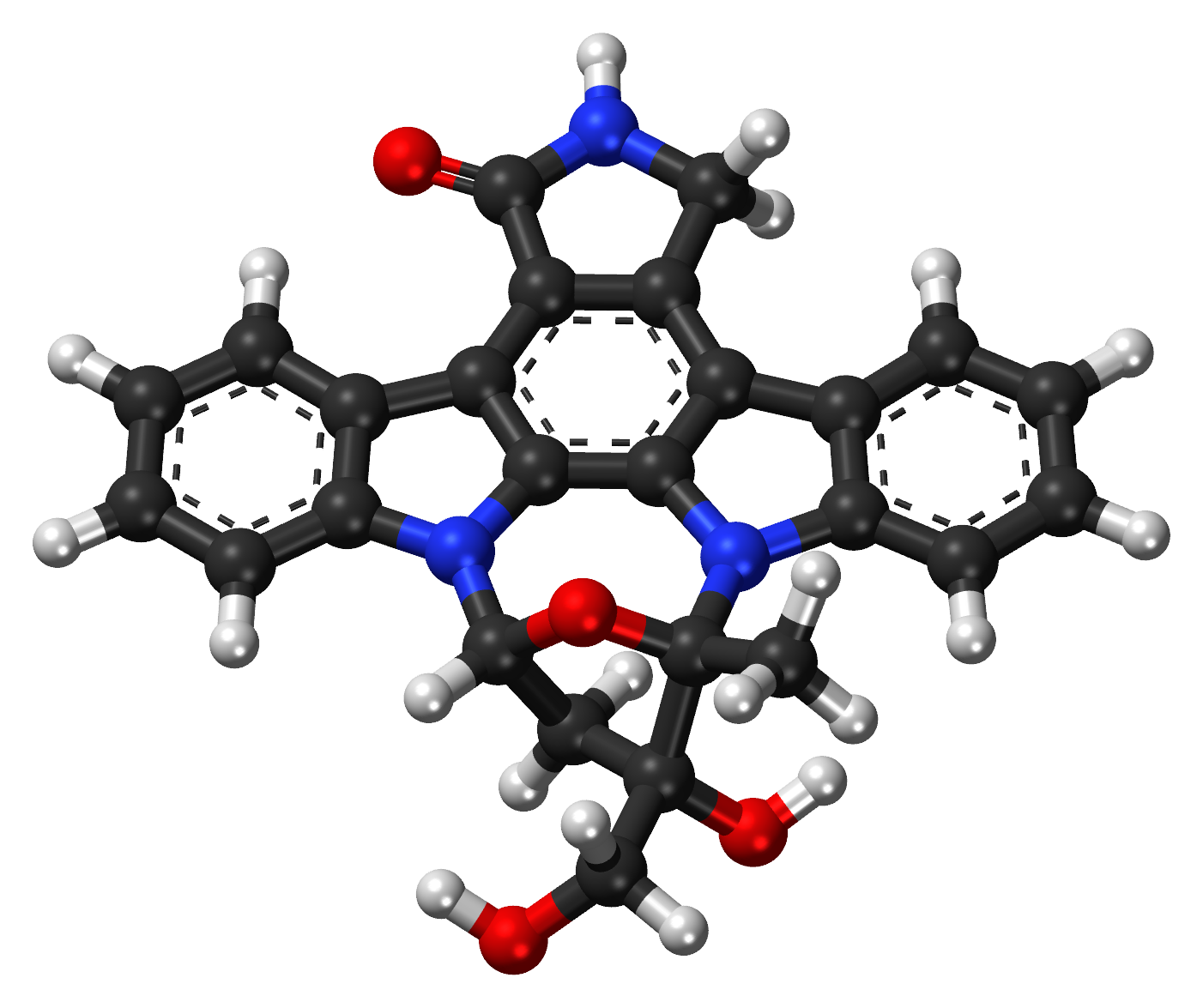

Clinical data
- Routes of administration: By mouth
- ATC code: None

Pharmacokinetic data
- Protein binding: highly protein-bound, especially to α-1 acid glycoprotein
- Metabolism: liver P450 (CYP34A) enzyme system

Identifiers
- IUPAC name: (5S,6S,8R)-6-Hydroxy-6-(hydroxymethyl)-5-methyl-7,8,14,15-tetrahydro-5H-16-oxa-4b,8a,14-triaza-5,8-methanodibenzo[b,h]cycloocta[jkl]cyclopenta[e]-as-indacen-13(6H)-one
- CAS Number: 111358-88-4
- PubChem CID: 126565
- IUPHAR/BPS: 5672
- ChemSpider: 112457
- UNII: DO989GC5D1
- KEGG: D04696
- ChEMBL: ChEMBL603469
- CompTox Dashboard (EPA): DTXSID5046778

Chemical and physical data
- Formula: C_{26}H_{21}N_{3}O_{4}
- Molar mass: 439.471 g·mol^{−1}
- 3D model (JSmol): Interactive image
- SMILES: C[C@@]12[C@](C[C@@H](O1)n3c4ccccc4c5c3c6n2c7ccccc7c6c8c5C(=O)NC8)(CO)O
- InChI: InChI=1S/C26H21N3O4/c1-25-26(32,12-30)10-18(33-25)28-16-8-4-2-6-13(16)20-21-15(11-27-24(21)31)19-14-7-3-5-9-17(14)29(25)23(19)22(20)28/h2-9,18,30,32H,10-12H2,1H3,(H,27,31)/t18-,25+,26+/m1/s1; Key:UIARLYUEJFELEN-LROUJFHJSA-N

Lestaurtinib (rINN, codenamed CEP-701) is a tyrosine kinase inhibitor structurally related to staurosporine. This semisynthetic derivative of the indolocarbazole K252a was investigated by Cephalon as a treatment for various types of cancer. It is an inhibitor of the kinases fms-like tyrosine kinase 3 (FLT3), Janus kinase 2 (JAK2), tropomyosin receptor kinase (trk) A (TrkA), TrkB and TrkC.

== Uses ==
Lestaurtinib has undergone clinical trials for the treatment of various cancers, including pancreatic and prostate cancers, V617F JAK2 positive polycythemia vera and essential thrombocytosis, and refractory neuroblastoma. The most significant effort was invested in developing lestaurtinib for the treatment of acute myelogenous leukemia (AML). 24% of the adult AML-affected population exhibits FLT3 mutations, which are associated with an increased likelihood of relapse and mortality after treatment above the general AML population. FLT3 mutations suppress apoptosis in mutated cells, but lestaurtinib has the potential to overcome this suppression by inhibiting FLT3 kinase activity.

== Preclinical studies ==
Lestaurtinib was identified early on as a trk receptor tyrosine kinase (RTK) inhibitor, with a concentration inhibiting 50% of tyrosine kinase activity (IC50) of 25 nM. In vivo trials demonstrated a 50–70% reduction in tumor burden for xenografted pancreatic and prostate cancers; however, subsequent clinical trials for pancreatic and prostate cancers did not achieve the endpoints specified. In 2001, lestaurtinib was shown to have an IC50 of 2–3 nM with respect to FLT3 tyrosine kinase, with no significant effect on structurally similar tyrosine kinases at those concentrations. Since leukemias typically develop multiple pathways of survival, lestaurtinib was studied in conjunction with traditional chemotherapy; it was determined that, whereas lestaurtinib treatment prior to chemotherapy produced antagonistic results, lestaurtinib treatment concurrent or subsequent to chemotherapy produced synergistic results. Most recently, lestaurtinib’s potency as a JAK2 inhibitor was investigated.

== Clinical trials ==
Lestaurtinib was filed as Investigational New Drug (IND) number 76431.

Initial Phase I studies with lestaurtinib involved determination of pharmacokinetic parameters following a single dose in healthy volunteers. Next, safety and tolerability were investigated in a Phase I trial involving 30 volunteers with advanced solid tumors or lymphoma. Although there were no notable tumor responses, a strong correlation was noted between dose and adverse events, with the primary adverse event reported being gastrointestinal reaction. A Phase II study in 18 patients with pancreatic cancer was initiated for combination treatment with lestaurtinib and gemcitabine, but efficacy of lestaurtinib was not observed.

In 2004, a Phase I/II study involved 17 patients at 2 locations with relapsed, refractory poor-risk AML with FLT3 mutations; this study demonstrated effective FLT3 inhibition by lestaurtinib. A multi-center Phase II study of 29 patients above the age of 60 was initiated for treatment with lestaurtinib alone; the results, reported in 2006, indicated that the primary endpoint of complete remission was not achieved in any participants. Despite this failure, another multi-center Phase II trial involving 42 patients combined lestaurtinib with conventional chemotherapy; the results, reported in 2005, indicated that twice as many patients showed a clinical response when treated with lestaurtinib as compared to those not treated. Consequently, a Phase III trial was initiated with 224 patients for lestaurtinib following chemotherapy; no significant difference in cancer remission was seen between patients treated with chemotherapy alone and with lestaurtinib and chemotherapy, according to results in a 2011 report.

Additional clinical trials have been initiated since this Phase III trial. These include a multi-center Phase II trial involving 37 patients with V617F JAK2 positive polycythemia vera and essential thrombocytosis; results published in 2014 indicate that the trial did not achieve the endpoint of 15% reduction of V617F JAK2 allele burden in 15% of patients. A Phase I study of 47 patients reported in 2010 that treatment of refractory neuroblastoma was well tolerated at the recommended doses, and an additional Phase I study in children with refractory neuroblastoma was completed in 2011. Phase I results were reported in 2015 for a lestaurtinib trial involving patients with V617F JAK2 positive myelofibrosis.

== Commercialization and intellectual property ==
Lestaurtinib was studied by Cephalon, an international pharmaceutical company based in Frazer, PA. Founded in 1987, Cephalon had grown to a Fortune 1000 company by 2011, with 4000 employees and 170 products sold in 100 countries.

Lestaurtinib was mentioned as one of two oncology drugs being developed by Cephalon in a 2007 U.S. Securities and Exchange Commission (SEC) report. According to this report, in addition to holding patent applications involving methods of treatment, formulations, and polymorphs of lestaurtinib, Cephalon held a composition of matter patent for lestaurtinib in the United States that would expire in 2008. In 2006, the U.S. FDA granted lestaurtinib orphan drug status for the treatment of AML, reflecting the significant need but minimal market for treatment of AML. In the wake of preliminary failing results for the Phase III clinical trial involving Lestaurtinib, Cephalon founder and CEO Frank Baldino, Ph.D., issued the following statement in 2009:

We made a significant financial investment in this pioneering effort to develop lestaurtinib for this molecularly targeted patient population with a poor prognosis and few treatment options. Patients with life-threatening diseases need companies like Cephalon to make that investment and take that risk if we are to improve patient outcomes and the overall cost of healthcare.

In 2011, Cephalon was acquired by Teva Pharmaceutical Industries (NASDAQ: TEVA) for $6.8 billion in cash, making Cephalon a wholly owned subsidiary of Teva. This acquisition was in line with Teva’s vision to expand their branded and specialty drug offerings, more than doubling branded drug sales to a value of $7 billion. In their 2011 annual SEC report, Teva did not include lestaurtinib in a listing of major oncology drugs in their pipeline.

A significant number of patents are related to lestaurtinib. A Google patent search yields 1,278 patents involving lestaurtinib, 6 of which include lestaurtinib in the title and 8 of which are assigned to Cephalon. 2,017 patents involve CEP-701, none of which include CEP-701 in the title and 8 of which are assigned to Cephalon. 13,666 patents are related to FLT3 inhibitors, 7 of which include FLT3 inhibition in the title and 3 of which are assigned to Cephalon. FLT3 inhibitors currently undergoing clinical trials for AML include sorafenib, midostaurin, and quizartinib.

== See also ==
- Janus kinase inhibitor
