= MiR-212 =

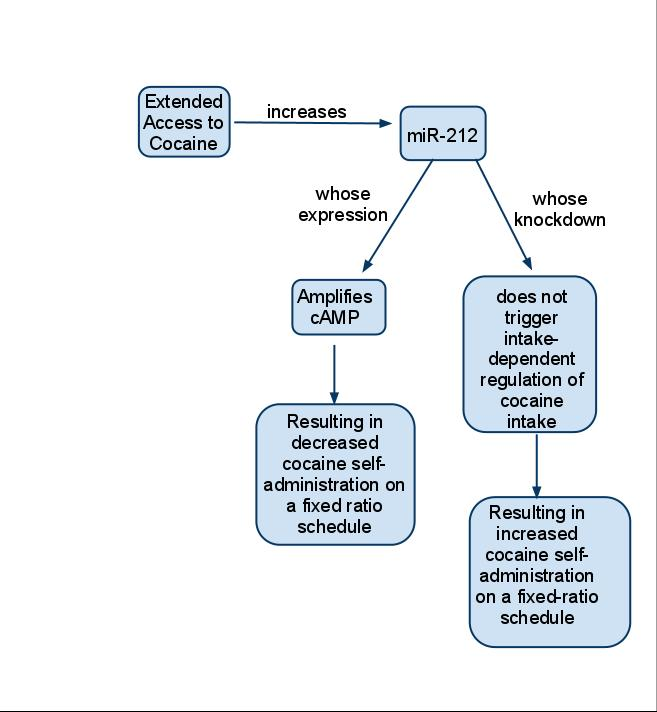
As proven in the Hollander et al. paper.

MiR-212 is a short non-coding RNA molecule. MicroRNAs function to regulate the expression levels of other genes by several mechanisms, generally reducing protein levels through the cleavage of mRNAs or the repression of their translation. Several targets for miR-132 have been described, including mediators of neurological development, synaptic transmission, inflammation and angiogenesis.

Mir-212 has shown a promising value in cancer prognosis and diagnosis.

The RNA molecule miR-212 arises from the miR-212/132 cluster located in the intron of a non-coding gene on mouse chromosome 11.

== Heart pathology ==
Research in Germany has found that miR-132 and mir-132 can inhibit cardiac pathology in rodents.
