= NT4 =

NT4 may refer to:

- Windows NT 4.0
- NT-4, a type of neurotrophin
