= R7 (drug) =

Chemical compound

Clinical data
- Other names: 4-Oxo-2-phenyl-4H-chromene-7,8-diyl bis(dimethylcarbamate)
- Routes of administration: By mouth

Legal status
- Legal status: US: Investigational New Drug

Pharmacokinetic data
- Bioavailability: ~35% (in mice)
- Metabolites: Tropoflavin
- Elimination half-life: ~3.25 hours (in mice

Identifiers
- IUPAC name: [8-(Dimethylcarbamoyloxy)-4-oxo-2-phenylchromen-7-yl] N,N-dimethylcarbamate
- CAS Number: 1609067-35-7
- PubChem CID: 73672564
- UNII: 2KYC4WG53K

Chemical and physical data
- Formula: C_{21}H_{20}N_{2}O_{6}
- Molar mass: 396.399 g·mol^{−1}
- 3D model (JSmol): Interactive image
- SMILES: CN(C)C(=O)OC1=C(C2=C(C=C1)C(=O)C=C(O2)C3=CC=CC=C3)OC(=O)N(C)C
- InChI: InChI=1S/C21H20N2O6/c1-22(2)20(25)28-16-11-10-14-15(24)12-17(13-8-6-5-7-9-13)27-18(14)19(16)29-21(26)23(3)4/h5-12H,1-4H3; Key:KHUMQRAGNPGBIE-UHFFFAOYSA-N

R7 is a small-molecule flavonoid and orally active, potent, and selective agonist of the tropomyosin receptor kinase B (TrkB) – the main signaling receptor for the neurotrophin brain-derived neurotrophic factor (BDNF) – which is under development for the treatment of Alzheimer's disease. It is a structural modification and prodrug of tropoflavin (7,8-DHF) with improved potency and pharmacokinetics, namely oral bioavailability and duration.

== Discovery ==
R7 was synthesized by the same researchers who were involved in the discovery of tropoflavin. A patent was filed for R7 in 2013 and was published in 2015. In 2016, it was reported to be in the preclinical stage of development. R7 was superseded by R13 because while R7 had a good drug profile in animals, it showed almost no conversion into tropoflavin in human liver microsomes.

Tropoflavin, a naturally occurring flavonoid, was found to act as an agonist of the TrkB with nanomolar affinity (K_{d} ≈ 320 nM).

Due to the presence of a vulnerable catechol group on its 2-phenyl-4H-chromene ring, tropoflavin is extensively conjugated via glucuronidation, sulfation, and methylation during first-pass metabolism in the liver and has a poor oral bioavailability of only 5% in mice upon oral administration. As such, tropoflavin itself is a poor candidate for clinical development as an oral medication. R7 is a derivative of tropoflavin with carbamate moieties on its hydroxyl groups, thereby protecting it from metabolism.

== Pharmacokinetics ==
As R7 is a slightly larger molecule than tropoflavin, 72.5 mg R7 is molecularly equivalent to 50 mg tropoflavin. Relative to a roughly molecularly equivalent dose of tropoflavin, the area-under-curve levels of R7 were found to be 7.2-fold higher upon oral administration to mice, and R7 hence has a greatly improved oral bioavailability in mice of approximately 35%. Moreover, whereas tropoflavin itself is mostly metabolized in mice within 30 minutes, tropoflavin as a metabolite was still detectable in plasma at 8 hours after administration with R7, indicating that R7 sustainably releases tropoflavin into circulation. In accordance, the terminal half-life of R7 is about 195 minutes (3.25 hours) in mice. The T_{max} of R7 is about 60 minutes in mice, and its C_{max} for a 78 mg/kg dose was 262 ng/mL, whereas that for a 50 mg/kg dose of tropoflavin was 70 ng/mL.

== Animal studies ==
Like tropoflavin, administration of R7 has been found to activate the TrkB in vivo in the mouse brain. Moreover, R7 was found to potently activate the TrkB and the downstream Akt signaling pathway upon oral administration, an action that was tightly correlated with plasma concentrations of tropoflavin. As such, R7 has shown in vivo efficacy as an agonist of the TrkB, including central activity, similarly to tropoflavin.

== See also ==
- List of investigational antidepressants
- Tropomyosin receptor kinase B § Agonists
