= LM22A-4 =

Chemical compound

Clinical data
- ATC code: None

Identifiers
- IUPAC name: 1-N,3-N,5-N-tris(2-Hydroxyethyl)benzene-1,3,5-tricarboxamide
- CAS Number: 37988-18-4
- PubChem CID: 2054170
- ChemSpider: 1548402
- UNII: 5GCL3P6AF5
- CompTox Dashboard (EPA): DTXSID201045819

Chemical and physical data
- Formula: C_{15}H_{21}N_{3}O_{6}
- Molar mass: 339.348 g·mol^{−1}
- 3D model (JSmol): Interactive image
- SMILES: C1=C(C=C(C=C1C(=O)NCCO)C(=O)NCCO)C(=O)NCCO
- InChI: InChI=1S/C15H21N3O6/c19-4-1-16-13(22)10-7-11(14(23)17-2-5-20)9-12(8-10)15(24)18-3-6-21/h7-9,19-21H,1-6H2,(H,16,22)(H,17,23)(H,18,24); Key:RGWJKANXFYJKHN-UHFFFAOYSA-N

LM22A-4 is a synthetic, selective small-molecule partial agonist of TrkB (EC_{50} for TrkB activation = 200–500 pM; IC_{50} for inhibition of BDNF binding to TrkB = 47 nM; IA = ~85%), the main receptor of brain-derived neurotrophic factor. It has been found to possess poor blood-brain-barrier penetration when administered systemically, so LM22A-4 has been given to animals instead via intranasal administration, with central nervous system TrkB activation observed. The compound produces neurogenic and neuroprotective effects in animals, and shows beneficial effects on respiration in animal models of Rett syndrome.

== See also ==
- Tropomyosin receptor kinase B § Agonists
