= Eutropoflavin =

Chemical compound

Clinical data
- ATC code: None

Identifiers
- IUPAC name: 2-[4-(dimethylamino)phenyl]-7,8-dihydroxy-4H-chromen-4-one
- CAS Number: 1205548-04-4
- PubChem CID: 44610701
- ChemSpider: 26630138
- UNII: B2M862MR4W
- ChEMBL: ChEMBL1800922
- CompTox Dashboard (EPA): DTXSID901045822

Chemical and physical data
- Formula: C_{17}H_{15}NO_{4}
- Molar mass: 297.310 g·mol^{−1}
- 3D model (JSmol): Interactive image
- SMILES: CN(C)c1ccc(cc1)c2cc(=O)c3ccc(c(c3o2)O)O
- InChI: InChI=1S/C17H15NO4/c1-18(2)11-5-3-10(4-6-11)15-9-14(20)12-7-8-13(19)16(21)17(12)22-15/h3-9,19,21H,1-2H3; Key:YPAYCZOHGRSGJS-UHFFFAOYSA-N

Eutropoflavin (4'-dimethylamino-7,8-dihydroxyflavone) is a synthetic flavone-type selective agonist of TrkB, the main receptor of brain-derived neurotrophic factor (BDNF), which was derived from structural modification of tropoflavin (7,8-DHF). Relative to tropoflavin, eutropoflavin possesses higher agonistic activity at TrkB, is significantly more potent than tropoflavin both in vitro and in vivo, and has a longer duration of action (peaking at 4 hours and "partially decaying" at 8~16 hours in rodents). The compound has been found to produce neuroprotective and neurogenic effects in the brain and spinal cord as well as antidepressant-like effects in animals. It has been sold online as a nootropic.

== See also ==
- Tropomyosin receptor kinase B § Agonists
