= SHC3 =

Protein-coding gene in the species Homo sapiens

Identifiers
- Aliases: SHC3, N-Shc, NSHC, RAI, SHCC, SHC adaptor protein 3
- External IDs: OMIM: 605263; MGI: 106179; GeneCards: SHC3

Gene location (Human)
| Chr. | Chromosome 9 (human) |
| Band | 9q22.1 | Start | 89,005,771 bp |
| Band | 9q22.1 | End | 89,178,818 bp |

Gene location (Mouse)
| Chr. | Chromosome 13 (mouse) |
| Band | 13 A5|13 26.12 cM | Start | 51,585,077 bp |
| Band | 13 A5|13 26.12 cM | End | 51,723,523 bp |
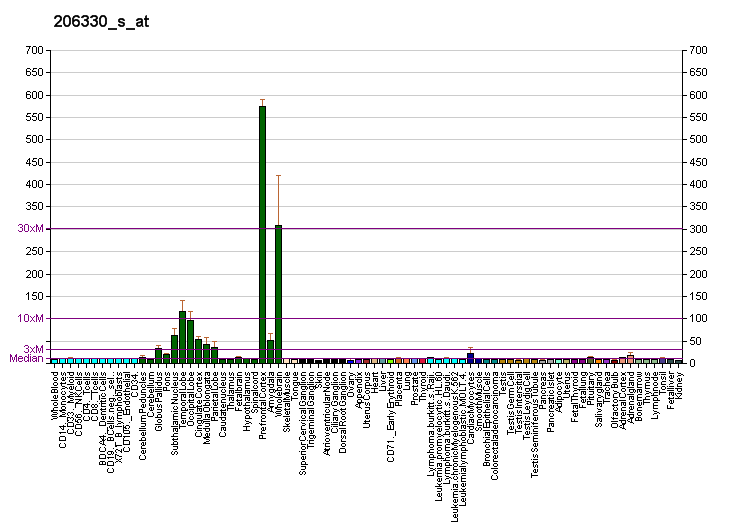
RNA expression pattern
| Bgee | Human / Mouse (ortholog); Top expressed in: Brodmann area 23; middle temporal gyrus; endothelial cell; superior frontal gyrus; postcentral gyrus; entorhinal cortex; primary visual cortex; orbitofrontal cortex; frontal pole; dorsolateral prefrontal cortex / Top expressed in: dentate gyrus of hippocampal formation granule cell; lumbar subsegment of spinal cord; superior frontal gyrus; superior surface of tongue; gallbladder; ventricular zone; primary visual cortex; secondary oocyte; zygote; morula; More reference expression data |
| BioGPS | More reference expression data |
Gene ontology
| Molecular function | receptor tyrosine kinase binding; signal transducer activity; protein binding; phosphotyrosine residue binding |
| Cellular component | cytosol; plasma membrane; cellular component |
| Biological process | intracellular signal transduction; epidermal growth factor receptor signaling pathway; synaptic transmission, glutamatergic; transmembrane receptor protein tyrosine kinase signaling pathway; MAPK cascade; central nervous system development; learning or memory; Ras protein signal transduction; signal transduction; axon guidance |
Sources:Amigo / QuickGO
Orthologs
| Databases | NCBI: entry; OMA: entry |
| Species | Human | Mouse |
| Entrez | 53358 | 20418 |
| Ensembl | ENSG00000148082 | ENSMUSG00000021448 |
| UniProt | Q92529 | Q61120 |
| RefSeq (mRNA) | NM_016848 | NM_009167 |
| RefSeq (protein) | NP_058544 | NP_033193 |
| Location (UCSC) | Chr 9: 89.01 – 89.18 Mb | Chr 13: 51.59 – 51.72 Mb |
| PubMed search |
- Wikidata
| View/Edit Human | View/Edit Mouse |

SHC-transforming protein 3 is a protein that in humans is encoded by the SHC3 gene.

== Interactions ==
SHC3 has been shown to interact with RICS and TrkB.
