= Braegen-02 =

Clinical data
- Drug class: TrkB agonist

Identifiers
- IUPAC name: 4-[6-oxo-2-(trifluoromethyl)-3H-pyrano[2,3-e]benzimidazol-8-yl]benzonitrile
- CAS Number: 2410598-89-7
- PubChem CID: 146347459
- ChemSpider: 123961613

Chemical and physical data
- Formula: C_{18}H_{8}F_{3}N_{3}O_{2}
- Molar mass: 355.276 g·mol^{−1}
- 3D model (JSmol): Interactive image
- SMILES: C1=CC(=CC=C1C#N)C2=CC(=O)C3=C(O2)C4=C(C=C3)NC(=N4)C(F)(F)F
- InChI: InChI=1S/C18H8F3N3O2/c19-18(20,21)17-23-12-6-5-11-13(25)7-14(26-16(11)15(12)24-17)10-3-1-9(8-22)2-4-10/h1-7H,(H,23,24); Key:XWJPZCVKIGMYPF-UHFFFAOYSA-N

Braegen-02 is a small-molecule drug which acts as a potent and selective agonist of the tropomyosin receptor kinase B (TrkB). It is commonly referred to as CF3CN due to the CF_{3} and CN groups in its chemical structure, but this may cause confusion with the unrelated chemical trifluoroacetonitrile which has the chemical formula CF_{3}CN. As with many TrkB agonists it was derived through modification of the natural product TrkB agonist 7,8-dihydroxyflavone, but it is more potent than earlier derivatives such as R13. It is under development as a potential treatment for neurodegenerative conditions such as Alzheimer's disease and Parkinson's disease.

== See also ==
- Tropomyosin receptor kinase B § Agonists
- BrAD-R13 (Braegen-01)
