= CRACD-like protein =

Mammalian protein found in humans

CRACDL

Identifiers
- Aliases: CRACDL, C2orf55, KIAA1211-like, KIAA1211 like, KIAA1211L, CRACD like
- External IDs: MGI: 1919347; GeneCards: CRACDL

Gene location (Human)
Chr.	Chromosome 2 (human)
Band	2q11.2	Start	98,793,846 bp
Band	2q11.2	End	98,936,259 bp

Gene location (Mouse)
Chr.	Chromosome 1 (mouse)
Band	1|1 B	Start	37,650,758 bp
Band	1|1 B	End	37,759,166 bp
RNA expression pattern
Bgee	Human / Mouse (ortholog); Top expressed in: bronchial epithelial cell; middle temporal gyrus; Brodmann area 23; endothelial cell; corpus epididymis; Brodmann area 46; entorhinal cortex; superior frontal gyrus; parietal lobe; postcentral gyrus / Top expressed in: olfactory tubercle; lateral septal nucleus; piriform cortex; subiculum; dentate gyrus; primary motor cortex; anterior amygdaloid area; hippocampus proper; superior frontal gyrus; dentate gyrus of hippocampal formation granule cell; More reference expression data
BioGPS	n/a
Orthologs
Databases	NCBI: entry; OMA: entry
Species	Human	Mouse
Entrez	343990	72097
Ensembl	ENSG00000196872	ENSMUSG00000026090
UniProt	Q6NV74	n/a
RefSeq (mRNA)	NM_207362	NM_028096
RefSeq (protein)	NP_997245	n/a
Location (UCSC)	Chr 2: 98.79 – 98.94 Mb	Chr 1: 37.65 – 37.76 Mb
PubMed search
- Wikidata
View/Edit Human	View/Edit Mouse

CRACD-like protein, previously known as KIAA1211L, is a protein that in humans is encoded by the CRACDL gene. It is highly expressed in the cerebral cortex of the brain. Furthermore, it is localized to the microtubules and the centrosomes and is subcellularly located in the nucleus. Finally, CRACDL is associated with certain mental disorders and various cancers.

== Gene ==
Chromosome	2 (2q.11.2)
Location	98,793,846 bp from pter to 98,936,259 bp from pter
Size	142,414 bases
Accession Number	NM_207362
Also Known As	KIAA1211 Like C2orf55 Chromosome 2 Open Reading Frame 55

CRACDL is a protein-coding gene. The table above presents the gene's alias, location, size and accession number.

== mRNA ==
There are 11 splice isoforms of the CRACDL. The validated isoform has 10 exons.

== Protein ==
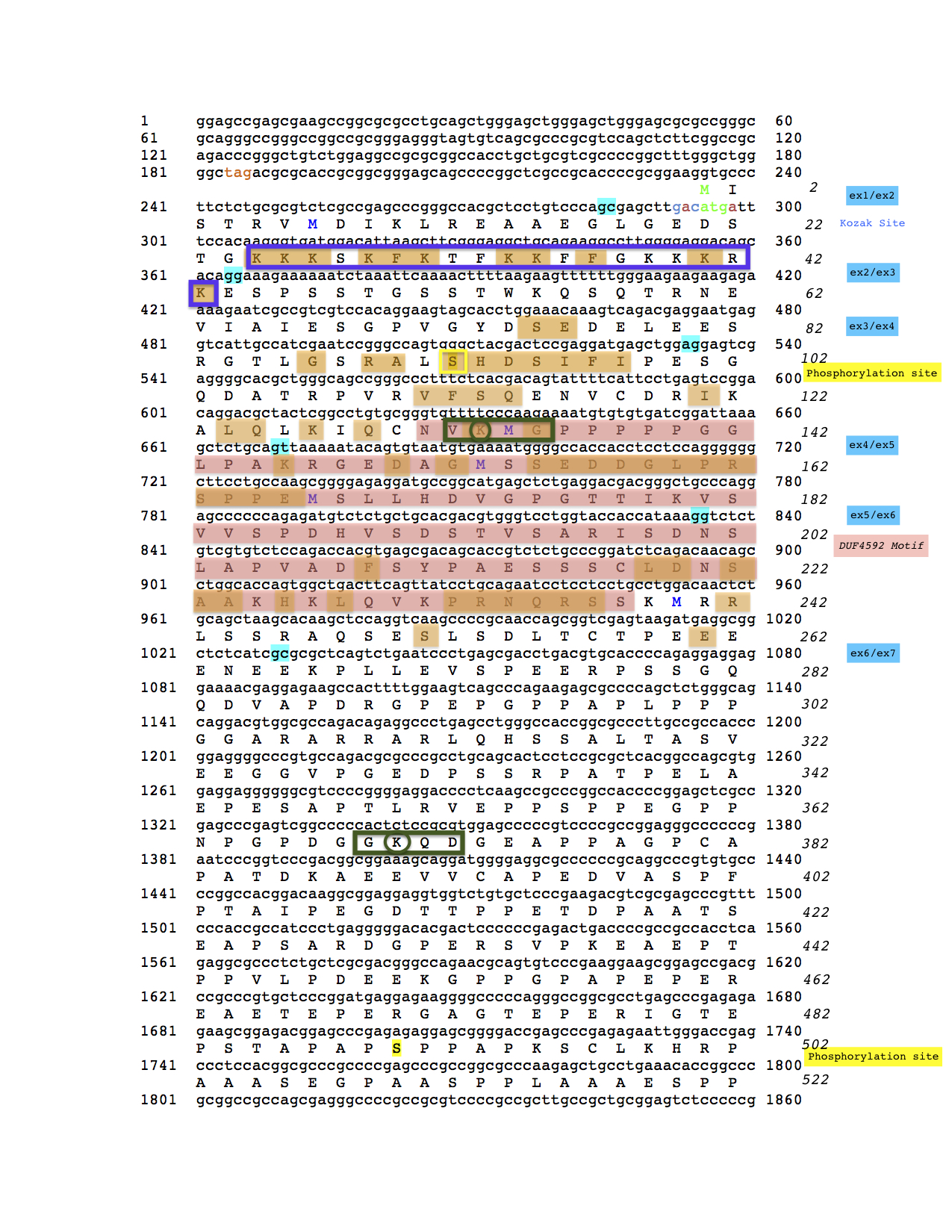
Conceptual Translation CRACDL Part 1. The upstream stop codon is orange, the exon boundaries are highlighted blue, the start codon is green, the predicted nuclear location signal is denoted by a purple box, the conserved regions are highlighted orange, the phosphorylation sites are highlighted yellow, the predicted SUMOylation sites are denoted by green boxes, the DUF4592 Motif is highlighted red.

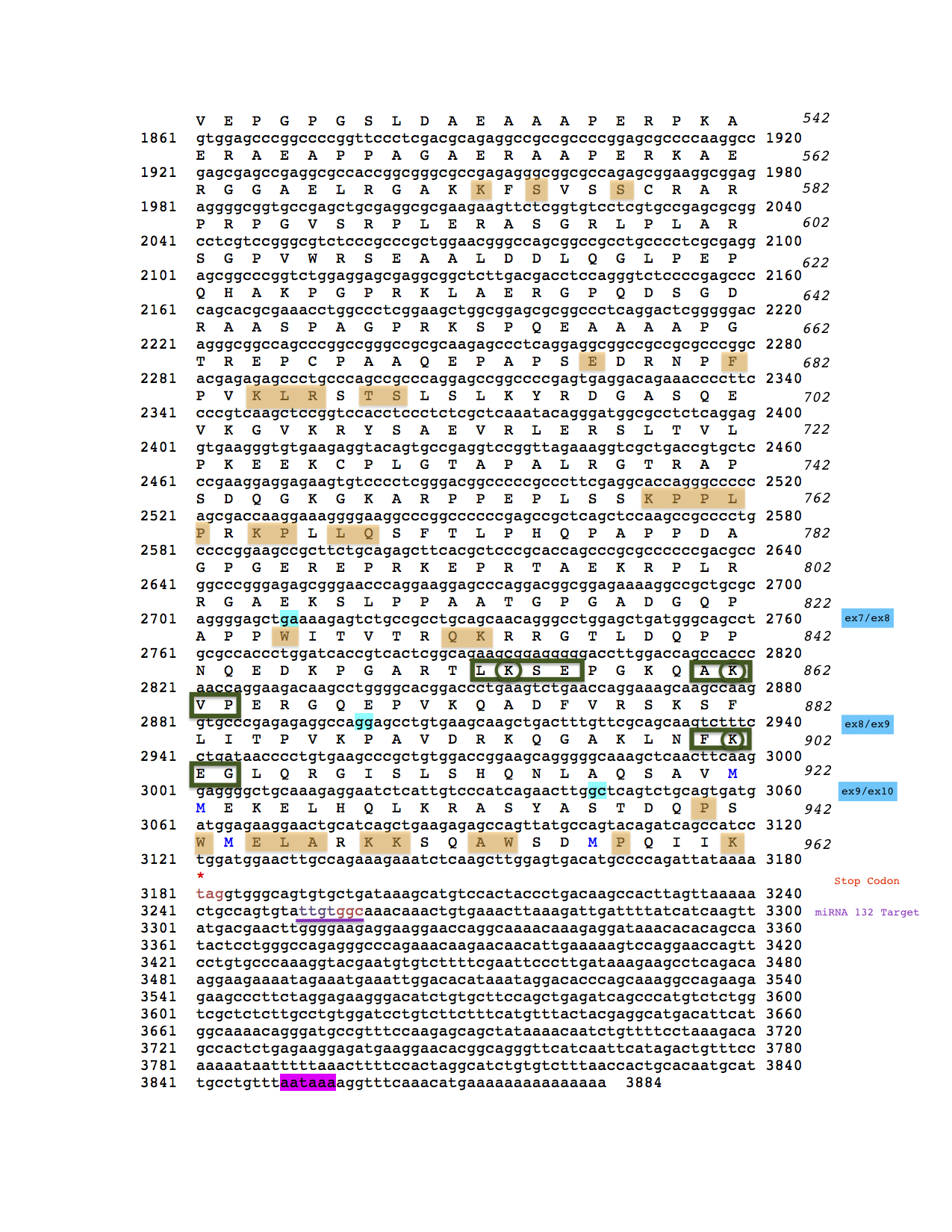
Conceptual Translation CRACDL Part 2. The exon boundaries are highlighted blue, the conserved regions are highlighted orange, the predicted SUMOylation sites are denoted by green boxes, the stop codon is red, the predicted miRNA 132 target is underlined in purple, and the polyadenylation signal is highlighted magenta.

Amino Acid Length	962
Molecular Weight	102 kda
Isoelectric Point	8
Accession Number	NP_997245.2
Also Known As	Uncharacterized Protein KIAA1211-like Uncharacterized Protein C2orf55 Hypothetical Protein LOC343990

The table above presents the protein's alias, size, and accession number. The CRACD-L protein is proline rich and asparagine, isoleucine, phenylalanine, and tyrosine poor.

=== Domains and motifs ===
CRACDL Schematic. This figure is a schematic illustration of CRACDL. The nuclear location signal is blue, the phosphorylation sites are red, the SUMOylation sites are grey, and the DUF4592 motif is orange.

The CRACD-L protein has one domain called the DUF4592 motif and spans amino acids 131–239. This domain is highly conserved among the CRACDL orthologs. The DUF4592 motif is depicted in both the conceptual translation and schematic figures.

=== Post translational modifications ===
CRACDL is phosphorylated at the Ser92 and Ser490 amino acids. The KIAA1211L protein is also predicted to have five different SUMOylation sites located at Lys134, Lys375, Lys866, Lys874, and Lys914. Both the phosphorylated sites and the SUMOylation sites are depicted in the conceptual translation and schematic figures.

=== Secondary structure ===
The CRACD-L protein predicted secondary structure is composed of 50% alpha helixes, 8.9% beta sheets, and 17.9% turns. The high number of turns is consistent with the fact that CRACD-L is proline rich.

=== Subcellular location ===
The CRACD-L protein is predicted to be located in the nucleus. The orthologs, including the elephant shark, horse, rock dove, and chimp, are also predicted to be located in the nucleus. The nuclear location signal is located on amino acids 25–43 which is depicted in both the conceptual translation and schematic figures. This signal is conserved throughout the orthologs. Additionally, this location (amino acids 24–43) is positively charged, probably due to the high amount of lysine at this location. Finally, it is predicted that CRACD-L is mainly localized to the microtubules and centrosome and sometimes localized to the cytokinetic bridge.

== Expression ==
The gene is highly expressed in the cerebral cortex of the brain. The CRACD-L protein is located in many different tissue types, including the brain, the hippocampus, the lung, breast carcinoma, the islets of Langerhans, the pancreas, the kidney, and 38 other tissues. Additionally, it is expressed an average amount compared to other human proteins.

=== Regulation of transcription ===
The promoter region of CRACDL is approximately 1340 base pairs with various predicted transcription factors. The glial cells missing homolog 1 and the oligodendrocyte lineage transcription factors are notable because CRACDL is highly expressed in the brain. Furthermore, the estrogen-related receptor alpha is also a notable transcription factor due to CRACDL's low expression levels when estrogen receptors are knocked down. Furthermore, CRACDL is predicted to be SUMOylated. The 3' UTR of CRACDL is predicted to be a targeted by miRNA-132, which is depicted in the conceptual translation figure.

== Function ==
=== Interacting proteins ===
Glycogen Synthase Kinase 3 Beta (GSK3B)

GSK3B is a protein kinase that regulates transcription factors and microtubules. As such, it phosphorylates proteins, decreasing their ability to bind and stabilize microtubules. The proteins it phosphorylates are the principle components of neurofibrillary tangles in Alzheimer disease. The protein is needed for the establishment of neuronal polarity and axon outgrowth and phosphorylates proteins in neuroblastoma cells. Furthermore, it is associated with bipolar disease and is active in breast cancer cells.

As such, the predicted interaction between CRACDL and GSK3B is likely because CRACDL is highly expressed in the brain, associated with bipolar disorder and breast cancer, and is localized on the microtubules. The interaction between GSK3B and CRACDL was predicted using anti bait coimmunoprecipitation, pull down, tandem affinity purification, fluorescence polarization spectroscopy, protein kinases assay, two hybrid, and confocal microscopy experiments.

CRACD-L protein is also predicted to interact with Alpha-synuclein (SNCA), E3 Ubiquitin-Protein Ligase Mdm2 (MDM2), Serine/Threonine-Protein Kinase PAK 1 (PAK 1), and DNA Replication Factor Cdt1 (CDT1).

=== Clinical significance ===
CRACDL is associated with depression, bipolar disorder, and schizophrenia. Additionally, CRACDL is associated with various cancers including ovarian, breast, etc.

== Homology ==
=== Paralogs ===
KIAA1211 is the paralog to KIAA1211L. KIAA1211 is located on chromosome 4 and has 1233 amino acids. Its percent identity to KIAA1211L is 21%. The KIAA1211 has an ortholog in the bacteria Proteus vulgarism, indicating the paralog duplicated 4290 million years ago, before KIAA1211L.

=== Orthologs ===
Below is the table of various KIAA1211L orthologs. It includes closely, intermediately, and distantly related orthologs. The most distant ortholog is the elephant shark, indicating KIAA1211L duplicated 473 MYA. The amino acids conserved among all the KIAA1211L orthologs are depicted in the conceptual translation.

Species	NCBI Accession #	Date of Divergence	Sequence Identity	Sequence Similarity
Pan troglodytes (Chimpanzee)	XP_515643.2	6.65 MYA	99.1%	99.3%
Octodon negus (Degu)	XP_004633240.1	90 MYA	65.9%	73.1%
Panthera pardus (Leopard)	XP_019312964.1	96 MYA	67.8%	73.3%
Anas platyrhynchos (Mallard Duck)	XP_012949224.1	312 MYA	41.2%	52.40%
Pygoscelis adeliae (Adélie penguin)	XP_009321834.1	312 MYA	38.5%	51.6%
Python bivittatus (Burmese python)	XP_007428826	312 MYA	34.2%	46.3%
Nanorana parker (High Himalaya frog)	XP_018418330.1	352 MYA	32.1%	43.7%
Callorhinchus milii (Elephant Shark)	XP_007889338.1	473 MYA	30.5%	42.4%

=== Phylogeny ===
The CRACDL gene is similar and conserved in mammals, birds, reptiles, amphibians, and fish. It is not conserved in bacteria, archaea, protists, plants, fungus, trichoplax, and invertebrates.
