= K252a =

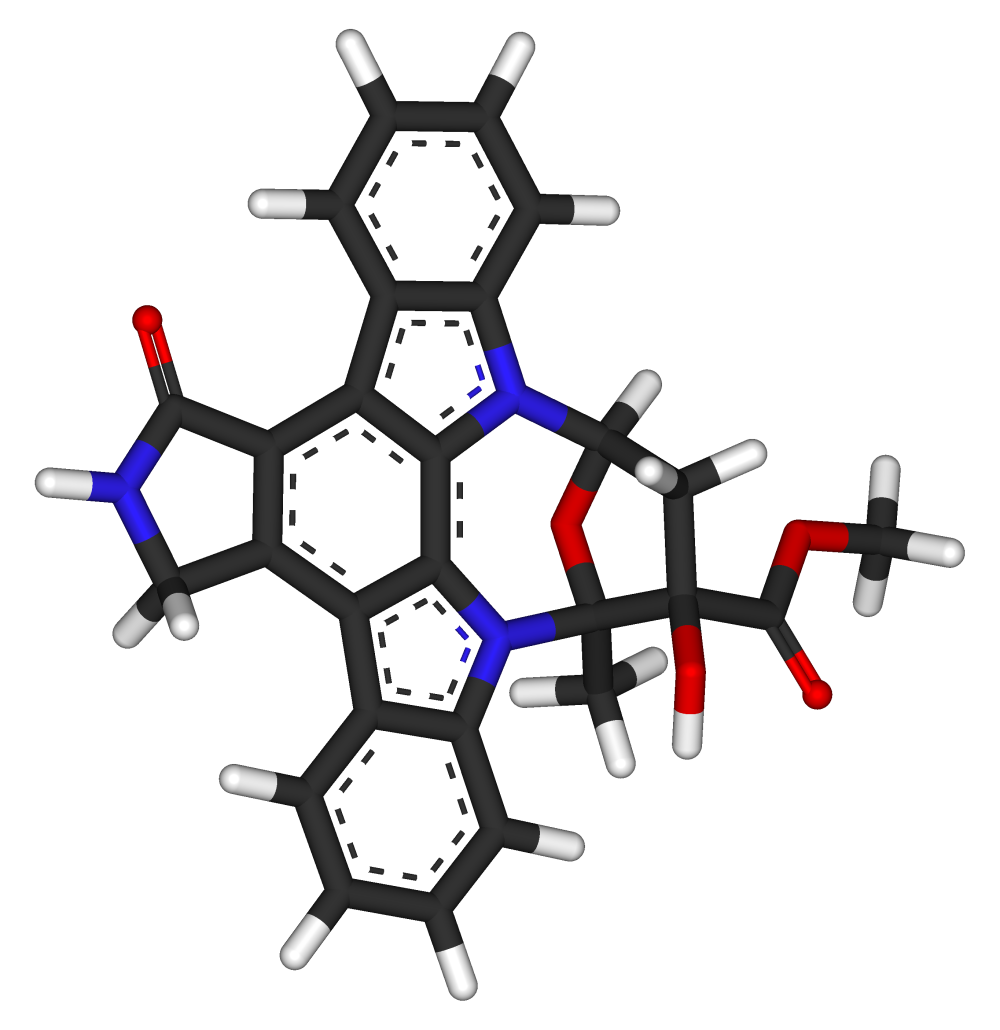

Names
- Preferred IUPAC name Methyl (13S,14R,16R)-14-hydroxy-13-methyl-5-oxo-6,7,13,14,15,16-hexahydro-5H-13,16-epoxydiindolo[1,2,3-fg:3′,2′,1′-kl]pyrrolo[3,4-i][1,6]benzodiazocine-14-carboxylate

Identifiers
CAS Number	99533-80-9
ChEMBL	ChEMBL281948
ChemSpider	2299962
ECHA InfoCard	100.167.781
IUPHAR/BPS	336
PubChem CID	3035817
UNII	IV7H45AM5B
CompTox Dashboard (EPA)	DTXSID40880065
- InChI: InChI=1S/C27H21N3O5/c1-26-27(33,25(32)34-2)11-18(35-26)29-16-9-5-3-7-13(16)20-21-15(12-28-24(21)31)19-14-8-4-6-10-17(14)30(26)23(19)22(20)29/h3-10,18,33H,11-12H2,1-2H3,(H,28,31)/t18?,26-,27-/m1/s1 Key: KOZFSFOOLUUIGY-CYBHFKQVSA-N

Properties
Chemical formula	C_{27}H_{21}N_{3}O_{5}
Molar mass	467.481 g·mol^{−1}
Solubility in other solvents	Soluble in DMSO, dichloromethane, and methanol
- Except where otherwise noted, data are given for materials in their standard state (at 25 °C [77 °F], 100 kPa). verify (what is ?) Infobox references

K252a is an alkaloid isolated from Nocardiopsis bacteria. This staurosporine analog is a highly potent cell permeable inhibitor of CaM kinase and phosphorylase kinase (IC_{50} = 1.8 and 1.7 nmol/L, respectively). At higher concentrations it is also an efficient inhibitor of serine/threonine protein kinases (IC_{50} of 10 to 30 nmol/L).

K252a is reported to promote myogenic differentiation in C2 mouse myoblasts and has been shown to block the neuronal differentiation of rat pheochromocytoma PC12 cells by inhibition of trk tyrosine kinase activity.

K252a has been reported in preclinical research as a potential treatment for psoriasis.

K252a inhibits tyrosine phosphorylation of Trk A induced by NGF. PC12 cells were incubated in the presence or absence of 10 ng/ml NGF with or without various concentrations of K252a.

== See also ==
- K252b
- Lestaurtinib
- ANA-12
- Cyclotraxin B
