= SPV-400 =

Clinical data
- Other names: SPV400
- Routes of administration: Parenteral
- Drug class: Tropomyosin receptor kinase B (TrkB) agonist

SPV-400 is a tropomyosin receptor kinase B (TrkB) agonist which is under development for the treatment of neurological disorders. It is taken parenterally. The preclinical pharmacokinetics of SPV-400 have been studied and described. The drug is under development by Spave Science. As of August 2025, it is in the preclinical research stage of development for neurological disorders. The chemical structure of SPV-400 does not yet appear to have been disclosed.

== See also ==
- Tropomyosin receptor kinase B § Agonists
