= Godmania =

Scientific classification
- Kingdom: Plantae
- Clade: Tracheophytes
- Clade: Angiosperms
- Clade: Eudicots
- Clade: Asterids
- Order: Lamiales
- Family: Bignoniaceae
- Clade: Crescentiina
- Clade: Tabebuia alliance
- Genus: Godmania; Hemsl. (1879)

Species
- Godmania aesculifolia (Kunth) Standl.; Godmania dardanoi (J.C.Gomes) A.H.Gentry

Synonyms
- Xerotecoma J.C.Gomes (1964)

Genus of flowering plants

Godmania is a genus of flowering plants in the family Bignoniaceae. It includes two species of trees native to the tropical Americas, ranging from central Mexico to Bolivia and northeastern Brazil.

- Godmania aesculifolia (Kunth) Standl.
- Godmania dardanoi (J.C.Gomes) A.H.Gentry
