= KT5720 =

Names
- IUPAC name (5R,6S,8S)-Hexyl 6-hydroxy-5-methyl-13-oxo-6,7,8,13,14,15-hexahydro-5H-16-oxa-4b,8a,14-triaza-5,8-methanodibenzo[b,h]cycloocta[jkl]cyclopenta[e]-as-indacene-6-carboxylate
- Other names KT 5720

Identifiers
CAS Number	108068-98-0
3D model (JSmol)	Interactive image
ChEBI	CHEBI:85085
ChemSpider	399960
ECHA InfoCard	100.238.838
PubChem CID	454202
UNII	58HV29I28S
CompTox Dashboard (EPA)	DTXSID40910614
- InChI: InChI=1S/C32H31N3O5/c1-3-4-5-10-15-39-30(37)32(38)16-23-34-21-13-8-6-11-18(21)25-26-20(17-33-29(26)36)24-19-12-7-9-14-22(19)35(28(24)27(25)34)31(32,2)40-23/h6-9,11-14,23,38H,3-5,10,15-17H2,1-2H3,(H,33,36)/t23-,31+,32+/m0/s1 Key: ZHEHVZXPFVXKEY-RUAOOFDTSA-N; InChI=1/C32H31N3O5/c1-3-4-5-10-15-39-30(37)32(38)16-23-34-21-13-8-6-11-18(21)25-26-20(17-33-29(26)36)24-19-12-7-9-14-22(19)35(28(24)27(25)34)31(32,2)40-23/h6-9,11-14,23,38H,3-5,10,15-17H2,1-2H3,(H,33,36)/t23-,31+,32+/m0/s1 Key: ZHEHVZXPFVXKEY-RUAOOFDTBS
- SMILES: CCCCCCOC(=O)[C@@]1(C[C@H]2N3C4=CC=CC=C4C5=C6C(=C7C8=CC=CC=C8N(C7=C53)[C@@]1(O2)C)CNC6=O)O

Properties
Chemical formula	C_{32}H_{31}N_{3}O_{5}
Molar mass	537.616 g·mol^{−1}
- Except where otherwise noted, data are given for materials in their standard state (at 25 °C [77 °F], 100 kPa). verify (what is ?) Infobox references

KT5720 is a kinase inhibitor with specificity towards protein kinase A. It is a semi-synthetic derivative of K252a and analog of staurosporine.

== Physiological Effects ==
=== Protein kinase A ===
KT5720 is an antagonist of protein kinase A. Protein kinase A (PKA) is a group of kinases that are cAMP-dependent that primarily phosphorylate serine or threonine residues in target proteins. PKA is a tetramer consisting of two catalytic subunits and two regulatory subunits, with the later holding the catalytic subunits in an inactive state. The binding of two cAMP molecules to each regulatory subunit causes an allosteric change that detaches the regulatory subunits from the catalytic subunits. This exposes the ATP-binding site of the kinase. KT5720 binds competitively to the ATP-binding site of the catalytic subunit of PKA and its effects are dependent on the cellular concentration of ATP.

There have been several studied effects on the inhibition of PKA through the binding of KT5720. KT5720 has been shown to effect dorsal root ganglion neurons through the inhibition of PKA. It reduced intracellular concentration of calcium ions as well as decrease the H-current in the HCN channels which decreased the excitability of rat neurons. Additionally, there is evidence to suggest that the inhibition of KT5720 affects endothelial cell response to irradiation. It has been shown to decrease irradiation-induced apoptosis in human pulmonary microvascular endothelial cells.

=== Non-PKA Targets ===
The purported target of KT5720 is PKA, however, it has displayed effects on other proteins. KT5720 has been shown to inhibit other protein kinases such as phosphorylase kinase (PHK) and pyruvate dehydrogenase kinase 1 (PDK1). One study determined that the IC_{50} was 11nM and 300nM for PHK and PDK1, respectively. This was significantly lower than the IC_{50} for PKA, determined to be 3.3 μM in the same study. This establishes that KT5720 can significantly affect other kinases, however, it cannot be used to determined the absolute specificity of KT5720 due to differing ATP concentrations in vitro and in vivo.

KT5720 has also been shown to affect platelet aggregation in rabbits. Its mechanism of action favored the inhibition of certain molecules such as serotonin but did not inhibit other platelets aggregation factors such as thrombin and collagen.
