= HIOC =

Chemical compound

Clinical data
- ATC code: None

Identifiers
- IUPAC name: N-[2-(5-Hydroxy-1H-indol-3-yl)ethyl]-2-oxo-3-piperidinecarboxamide
- CAS Number: 314054-36-9
- PubChem CID: 5012758
- ChemSpider: 4192105
- UNII: JC3KZQ72GW
- CompTox Dashboard (EPA): DTXSID401032115

Chemical and physical data
- Formula: C_{16}H_{19}N_{3}O_{3}
- Molar mass: 301.346 g·mol^{−1}
- 3D model (JSmol): Interactive image
- SMILES: c1cc2c(cc1O)c(c[nH]2)CCNC(=O)C3CCCNC3=O
- InChI: InChI=1S/C16H19N3O3/c20-11-3-4-14-13(8-11)10(9-19-14)5-7-18-16(22)12-2-1-6-17-15(12)21/h3-4,8-9,12,19-20H,1-2,5-7H2,(H,17,21)(H,18,22); Key:ZIMKJLALTRLXJO-UHFFFAOYSA-N

HIOC is a small-molecule agent which acts as a selective TrkB receptor agonist (active at at least 100 nM; prominent activation at 500 nM). It was derived from N-acetylserotonin (NAS). Relative to NAS, HIOC possesses greater potency and a longer half-life (~30 min or less for NAS in rats, while HIOC is still detectable up to 24 hours after administration to mice; ~4 hour half-life for HIOC in mouse brain tissues). It is described as producing long-lasting activation of the TrkB receptor and downstream signaling kinases associated with the receptor. HIOC is systemically active and is able to penetrate the blood-brain-barrier. In animal studies, HIOC was found to robustly protect against glutamate-induced excitotoxicity, an action which was TrkB-dependent.

A chemical synthesis of HIOC was published in 2015.

== See also ==
- Tropomyosin receptor kinase B § Agonists
