= ANA-12 =

Chemical compound

Clinical data
- ATC code: None

Identifiers
- IUPAC name: N-[2-[(2-oxoazepan-3-yl)carbamoyl]phenyl]-1-benzothiophene-2-carboxamide
- CAS Number: 219766-25-3
- PubChem CID: 2799722
- ChemSpider: 2078460
- UNII: 54S4JPT8JX
- CompTox Dashboard (EPA): DTXSID501045818
- ECHA InfoCard: 100.229.925

Chemical and physical data
- Formula: C_{22}H_{21}N_{3}O_{3}S
- Molar mass: 407.49 g·mol^{−1}
- 3D model (JSmol): Interactive image
- SMILES: C1CCNC(=O)C(C1)NC(=O)C2=CC=CC=C2NC(=O)C3=CC4=CC=CC=C4S3
- InChI: InChI=1S/C22H21N3O3S/c26-20(25-17-10-5-6-12-23-21(17)27)15-8-2-3-9-16(15)24-22(28)19-13-14-7-1-4-11-18(14)29-19/h1-4,7-9,11,13,17H,5-6,10,12H2,(H,23,27)(H,24,28)(H,25,26); Key:TUSCYCAIGRVBMD-UHFFFAOYSA-N

ANA-12 is a selective, small-molecule non-competitive antagonist of TrkB, the main receptor of brain-derived neurotrophic factor (BDNF). ANA-12 was originally discovered and developed by Cazorla M. and colleagues at Université Paris and Inserm in 2011. The compound crosses the blood-brain-barrier and exerts central TrkB blockade, producing effects as early as 30 minutes (~400 nM) and as long as 6 hours (~10 nM) following intraperitoneal injection in mice. It blocks the neurotrophic actions of BDNF without compromising neuron survival.

== Research ==
ANA-12 has two binding sites on TrkB, a high- and low-affinity site (K_{d} = 10 nM and 12 μM, respectively).

ANA-12 produces rapid antidepressant- and anxiolytic-like effects in animal models, the former of which have been elucidated to be mediated by blockade of BDNF signaling in the nucleus accumbens. It has also been found to alleviate methamphetamine-induced depression-like behavior (including anhedonia), behavioral sensitization, and nucleus accumbens neuroplasticity changes with subchronic (14-day) administration in mice, whereas the TrkB agonist 7,8-dihydroxyflavone was ineffective in doing so.

ANA-12 blocks the cognitive-enhancing effects of environmental enrichment and calorie restriction in rodents, which are mediated by BDNF signaling through TrkB in the hippocampus. It also blocks hippocampal neurogenesis induced by physical exercise in rodents, and may block the cognitive-enhancing effects of exercise as well.

== See also ==
- Tropomyosin receptor kinase B § Antagonists
