= 8-hydroxyquercetin 8-O-methyltransferase =

Class of enzymes

8-hydroxyquercitin 8-O-methyltransferase

Identifiers
- EC no.: 2.1.1.88
- CAS no.: 99775-17-4

Databases
- IntEnz: IntEnz view
- BRENDA: BRENDA entry
- ExPASy: NiceZyme view
- KEGG: KEGG entry
- MetaCyc: metabolic pathway
- PRIAM: profile
- PDB structures: RCSB PDB PDBe PDBsum
- Gene Ontology: AmiGO / QuickGO
Search
- PMC: articles
- PubMed: articles
- NCBI: proteins

8-hydroxyquercetin 8-O-methyltransferase (EC 2.1.1.88) is an enzyme that catalyzes the chemical reaction

gossypetin
+ SAM
corniculatusin
+ SAH

This is a methylation reaction in which the flavonol, gossypetin, is converted to the O-methylated flavonoid corniculatusin. The methyl group comes from the cofactor, S-adenosyl methionine (SAM), which becomes S-adenosyl-L-homocysteine (SAH). The product takes its name from the plant Lotus corniculatus in which it is found.

This enzyme belongs to the family of transferases, specifically those transferring one-carbon group methyltransferases. The systematic name of this enzyme class is S-adenosyl-L-methionine:3,5,7,8,3',4'-hexahydroxyflavone 8-O-methyltransferase. Other names in common use include flavonol 8-O-methyltransferase, flavonol 8-methyltransferase, S-adenosyl-L-methionine:3,3',4',5,7,8-hexahydroxyflavone, 8-O-methyltransferase, and 8-hydroxyquercitin 8-O-methyltransferase [mis-spelt].
