= Rho GTPase-activating protein 32 =

Protein-coding gene in the species Homo sapiens

ARHGAP32

Identifiers
- Aliases: ARHGAP32, GC-GAP, GRIT, PX-RICS, RICS, p200RhoGAP, p250GAP, Rho GTPase activating protein 32
- External IDs: OMIM: 608541; MGI: 2450166; GeneCards: ARHGAP32
Available structures
PDB	Ortholog search: PDBe RCSB
PDB	List of PDB id codes 3IUG

Gene location (Human)
Chr.	Chromosome 11 (human)
Band	11q24.3	Start	128,965,060 bp
Band	11q24.3	End	129,279,324 bp

Gene location (Mouse)
Chr.	Chromosome 9 (mouse)
Band	9|9 A4	Start	32,027,432 bp
Band	9|9 A4	End	32,179,742 bp
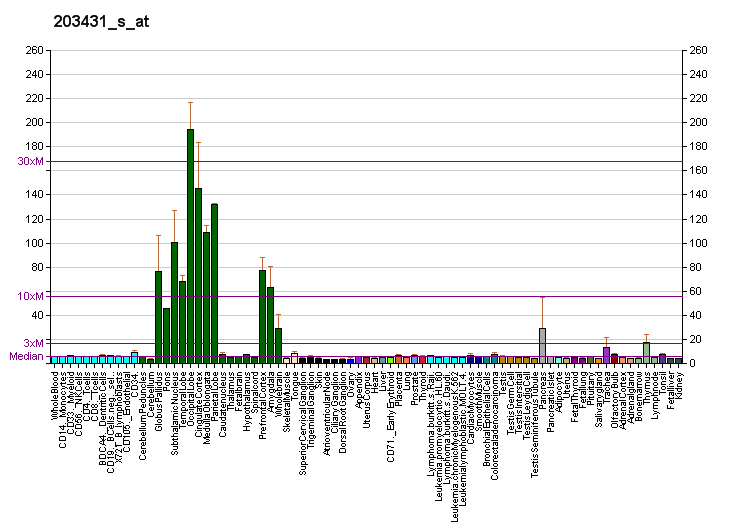

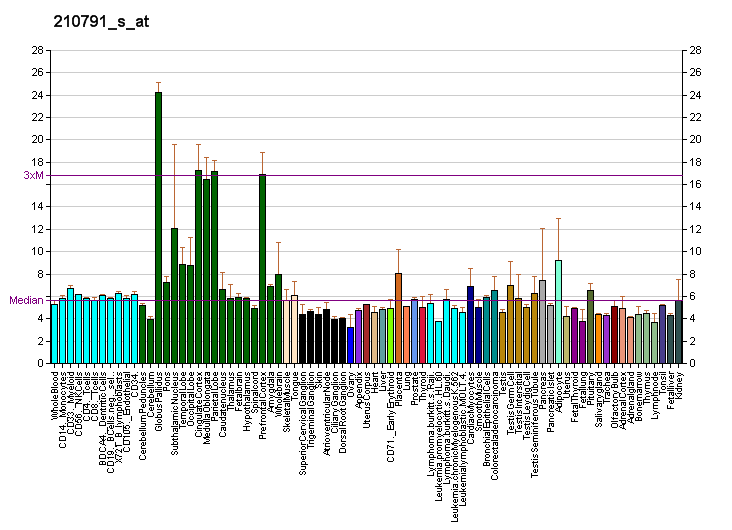
RNA expression pattern
Bgee	Human / Mouse (ortholog); Top expressed in: middle temporal gyrus; secondary oocyte; postcentral gyrus; endothelial cell; Brodmann area 23; superior frontal gyrus; primary visual cortex; entorhinal cortex; sural nerve; palpebral conjunctiva / Top expressed in: primary motor cortex; cingulate gyrus; lateral geniculate nucleus; olfactory tubercle; prefrontal cortex; lateral septal nucleus; anterior amygdaloid area; piriform cortex; mammillary body; ventromedial nucleus; More reference expression data
BioGPS	More reference expression data
Gene ontology
Molecular function	protein binding; phosphatidylinositol binding; GTPase activator activity; phosphatidylinositol phosphate binding
Cellular component	cytoplasm; cytosol; endosome; postsynaptic membrane; cell projection; endoplasmic reticulum membrane; membrane; postsynaptic density; Golgi membrane; plasma membrane; dendritic spine; synapse; cell junction; endoplasmic reticulum; endosome membrane; fibrillar center; nucleoplasm; Golgi apparatus; cell cortex; actin cytoskeleton
Biological process	positive regulation of GTPase activity; regulation of small GTPase mediated signal transduction; signal transduction; small GTPase mediated signal transduction
Sources:Amigo / QuickGO
Orthologs
Databases	NCBI: entry; OMA: entry
Species	Human	Mouse
Entrez	9743	330914
Ensembl	ENSG00000134909	ENSMUSG00000041444
UniProt	A7KAX9	Q811P8
RefSeq (mRNA)	NM_001142685; NM_014715; NM_001378024; NM_001378025	NM_001195632; NM_177379; NM_001370957; NM_001370958
RefSeq (protein)	NP_001136157; NP_055530; NP_001364953; NP_001364954	NP_001182561; NP_796353; NP_001357886; NP_001357887
Location (UCSC)	Chr 11: 128.97 – 129.28 Mb	Chr 9: 32.03 – 32.18 Mb
PubMed search
- Wikidata
View/Edit Human	View/Edit Mouse

Rho GTPase-activating protein 32 is a protein that in humans is encoded by the ARHGAP32 gene (previously RICS). RICS has two known isoforms, RICS that are expressed primarily at neurite growth cones, and at the post synaptic membranes, and PX-RICS which is more widely expressed in the endoplasmic reticulum, Golgi apparatus and endosomes. The only known domain of the RICS is the RhoGAP domain, whilst PX-RICS has an additional Phox homology and SH3 domain.

== Function ==
RICS (a.k.a. GRIT/Arhgap32) is a neuron-associated GTPase-activating protein that may regulate dendritic spine morphology and strength by modulating Rho GTPase activity.

== Isoforms ==
=== RICS ===
Experiments have shown that knocking down RICS, or just knocking out its GAP or C-terminal TrkA binding site, results in abnormally extended neurites, and blocks NGF regulated outgrowth.

The GAP activity of RICS is known to be regulated by two phosphorylation sites, one controlled by CaMKII, and the other by RPTPa. When CaMKII is activated by Ca^{2+} entry through NMDA receptors and inactivates RICS through phosphorylation, which in turn increases the active GTP-bound forms of Cdc42 and Rac1. This would thereby induce, for example, remodeling of dendritic spines. Because it has been shown in some experiments that Cdc42 does not affect spine morphology, whilst others have shown that Rac1 does (via the PAK1, LIMK, CFL1 pathway), the most likely pathway is via Rac1. That RACS also binds to β-catenin and N-cadherins, in vivo within the PSD (which it binds to through PSD-95, and weak binding to the NR2 subunits) suggests that there may be another pathway for it modifying spine structure as well. The RPTPa controlled phosphorylation site controls the specificity of the GAP activity, through a mechanism thought to involve movement of the c-terminal region of RICS. In the phosphorylated state, RICS can affect Rac, Rho and Cdc42, but after dephosphorylation by RPTPa it can only affect Rac. A further phosphorylation site, regulated by FYN controls the binding of RPTPa to RICS.

=== PX-RICS ===
PX-RICS is the dominant isoform expressed during nervous system development. It is known to have much lower GAP activity than RICS. Although it is more generally expressed than RICS, it is still known to inhibit neuronal elongation. Furthering the idea that it is a synaptically relevant isoform is that it is known to bind NR2B and PSD95 in vivo.

PX-RICS is known to be involved in transport of certain synaptic proteins which lack ER export signals, from the endoplasmic reticulum, to the Golgi apparatus. This has been shown for the β-catenin and N-cadherin, the later of which lacks the ER export signal, and the former which binds the later within the ER as a necessary but not sufficient part of its export process. PX-RICS was found to be a necessary component for the export of this complex to the Golgi and then onwards to the cellular membrane. PX-RICS is thought to do this by first localizing to the ER membrane---this it does by binding to GABARAP which binds ER, and through its Phox homology domain, which has a high binding affinity for Pi4P, the predominant phosphoinositide in the endoplasmic reticulum and Golgi apparatus. PX-RICS is then thought to bind a heterodimer of the 14-3-3 proteins encoded by YWHAZ and YWHAQ genes. The site were this binding occurs is a RSKSDP site in PX-RICS c-terminal, which is phosphorylated by CAMKII to encourage the binding. It has also now been shown that membrane transport of FGFR4, a N-Cadherin binding protein, is affected by PX-RICS knockdown.

== Interactions ==
RICS (gene) has been shown to interact with:

- BCAR1,
- CDC42,
- CRK,
- CRKL,
- FYN,
- GAB2,
- GRIN2B,
- NCK1,
- RAC1,
- RHOA,
- SHC3,
- Src, and
- TrkA.

The Mir-132 microRNA has been described as targeting the mRNA from this gene for degradation; this is thought to be important in the regulation of neuronal development.
