= R13 (drug) =

Chemical compound

Clinical data
- Other names: R-13; BrAD-R13; BrADR13; Braegen-01; Braegen01; 4-Oxo-2-phenyl-4H-chromene-7,8-diyl bis(methylcarbamate)
- Routes of administration: Oral
- Drug class: TrkB agonist
- ATC code: None

Pharmacokinetic data
- Metabolites: Tropoflavin

Identifiers
- IUPAC name: [8-(methylcarbamoyloxy)-4-oxo-2-phenylchromen-7-yl] N-methylcarbamate
- CAS Number: 1609067-49-3
- PubChem CID: 90117609
- UNII: OGG19T0LU2

Chemical and physical data
- Formula: C_{19}H_{16}N_{2}O_{6}
- Molar mass: 368.345 g·mol^{−1}
- 3D model (JSmol): Interactive image
- SMILES: CNC(=O)OC1=C(C2=C(C=C1)C(=O)C=C(O2)C3=CC=CC=C3)OC(=O)NC
- InChI: InChI=1S/C19H16N2O6/c1-20-18(23)26-14-9-8-12-13(22)10-15(11-6-4-3-5-7-11)25-16(12)17(14)27-19(24)21-2/h3-10H,1-2H3,(H,20,23)(H,21,24); Key:NWWRHMSYZTWUBD-UHFFFAOYSA-N

R13, also known as BrAD-R13 or as Braegen-01, is a small-molecule flavonoid and orally active, potent, and selective agonist of the tropomyosin receptor kinase B (TrkB), the main signaling receptor for the neurotrophin brain-derived neurotrophic factor (BDNF), which is under development for the potential treatment of Alzheimer's disease, amyotrophic lateral sclerosis (ALS), depressive disorders, Parkinson's disease, and schizophrenia. It is taken orally.

The drug is a structural modification and prodrug of 7,8-dihydroxyflavone (7,8-DHF; tropoflavin) with improved potency and pharmacokinetics, namely oral bioavailability and duration. The compound is a replacement for the earlier tropoflavin prodrug R7 and has similar properties to it. It was developed because while R7 displayed a good drug profile in animal studies, it showed almost no conversion into tropoflavin in human liver microsomes. In contrast to R7, R13 is readily hydrolyzed into tropoflavin in human liver microsomes.

R13, under the synonym and developmental code name BrAD-R13, is being developed by Braegen Pharmaceutical in China. As of August 2025, it is in phase 1 clinical trials for Alzheimer's disease and the preclinical research stage of development for all other indications.

== See also ==
- Tropomyosin receptor kinase B § Agonists
- List of investigational antidepressants
- List of investigational antipsychotics
- Braegen-02
