= Godmania aesculifolia =

Conservation status
- Least Concern (IUCN 3.1)

Scientific classification
- Kingdom: Plantae
- Clade: Tracheophytes
- Clade: Angiosperms
- Clade: Eudicots
- Clade: Asterids
- Order: Lamiales
- Family: Bignoniaceae
- Genus: Godmania
- Species: G. aesculifolia

Binomial name
- Godmania aesculifolia (Kunth) Standl.

Synonyms
- Bignonia aesculifolia Kunth; Cybistax macrocarpa Benth.; Godmania macrocarpa (Benth.) Hemsl.; Godmania uleana Kraenzl. Synonym; Tabebuia aesculifolia (Kunth) Hemsl.; Tabebuia fuscata Hemsl.; Tabebuia globiflora Ernst; Tecoma aesculifolia (Kunth) DC.; Tecoma digitata Kunth; Tecoma fuscata DC.

Species of plant

Godmania aesculifolia is a species of flowering plant in the family Bignoniaceae, native to the New World tropics. A tree, it contains 7,8-dihydroxyflavone, a flavonoid.
