= Tropoflavin =

Chemical compound

Clinical data
- Other names: 7,8-Dihydroxyflavone; 7,8-DHF

Pharmacokinetic data
- Bioavailability: ~5% (in mice)
- Elimination half-life: < 30 minutes (in mice)

Identifiers
- IUPAC name: 7,8-Dihydroxy-2-phenyl-4H-chromen-4-one
- CAS Number: 38183-03-8
- PubChem CID: 1880
- ChemSpider: 1809
- UNII: ADB6MA8ZV2
- ChEBI: CHEBI:140464
- CompTox Dashboard (EPA): DTXSID00191568
- ECHA InfoCard: 100.048.903

Chemical and physical data
- Formula: C_{15}H_{10}O_{4}
- Molar mass: 254.241 g·mol^{−1}
- 3D model (JSmol): Interactive image
- SMILES: c1ccc(cc1)c2cc(=O)c3ccc(c(c3o2)O)O
- InChI: InChI=1S/C15H10O4/c16-11-7-6-10-12(17)8-13(19-15(10)14(11)18)9-4-2-1-3-5-9/h1-8,16,18H; Key:COCYGNDCWFKTMF-UHFFFAOYSA-N

F

Tropoflavin, also known as 7,8-dihydroxyflavone (7,8-DHF), is a naturally occurring flavone found in Godmania aesculifolia, Tridax procumbens, and Primula vulgaris. It has been found to act as a potent and selective small-molecule agonist of the tropomyosin receptor kinase B (TrkB) (K_{d} ≈ 320 nM), the main signaling receptor of the neurotrophin brain-derived neurotrophic factor (BDNF). Tropoflavin is both orally bioavailable and able to penetrate the blood–brain barrier. A prodrug of tropoflavin with greatly improved potency and pharmacokinetics, R13 (and, formerly, R7), is under development for the treatment of Alzheimer's disease.

Tropoflavin has demonstrated therapeutic efficacy in animal models of a variety of central nervous system disorders, including depression, Alzheimer's disease, cognitive deficits in schizophrenia, Parkinson's disease, Huntington's disease, amyotrophic lateral sclerosis, traumatic brain injury, cerebral ischemia, fragile X syndrome, and Rett syndrome. Tropoflavin also shows efficacy in animal models of age-associated cognitive impairment and enhances memory consolidation and emotional learning in healthy rodents. In addition, tropoflavin possesses powerful antioxidant activity independent of its actions on the TrkB receptor, and protects against glutamate-induced excitotoxicity, 6-hydroxydopamine-induced dopaminergic neurotoxicity, and oxidative stress-induced genotoxicity. It was also found to block methamphetamine-induced dopaminergic neurotoxicity, an effect which, in contrast to the preceding, was found to be TrkB-dependent.

In 2017, evidence was published suggesting that tropoflavin and various other reported small-molecule TrkB agonists might not actually be direct agonists of the TrkB and might be mediating their observed effects by other means.

Tropoflavin has been found to act as a weak aromatase inhibitor in vitro (K_{i} = 10 μM), though there is evidence to suggest that this might not be the case in vivo. In addition, it has been found to inhibit aldehyde dehydrogenase and estrogen sulfotransferase in vitro (K_{i} = 35 μM and 1–3 μM, respectively), although similarly to the case of aromatase, these activities have not yet been confirmed in vivo. Unlike many other flavonoids, tropoflavin does not show any inhibitory activity on 17β-hydroxysteroid dehydrogenase. Tropoflavin has also been observed to possess in vitro antiestrogenic effects at very high concentrations (K_{i} = 50 μM).

A variety of close structural analogues of tropoflavin have also been found to act as TrkB agonists in vitro, including diosmetin (5,7,3'-trihydroxy-4'-methoxyflavone), norwogonin (5,7,8-trihydroxyflavone), eutropoflavin (4'-dimethylamino-7,8-dihydroxyflavone), 7,8,3'-trihydroxyflavone, 7,3'-dihydroxyflavone, 7,8,2'-trihydroxyflavone, 3,7,8,2'-tetrahydroxyflavone, and 3,7-dihydroxyflavone. The highly hydroxylated analogue gossypetin (3,5,7,8,3',4'-hexahydroxyflavone), conversely, appears to be an antagonist of TrkB in vitro.

Tropoflavin was also found to decrease mouse sleep in dark phase and reduce hypothalamus level of orexin A, but not orexin B, in mice.

== See also ==
- List of investigational antidepressants
- Tropomyosin receptor kinase B § Agonists
- BrAD-R13 (Braegen-01) and Braegen-02
