= CDR132L =

Antisense RNA medical therapy

CDR132L is an antisense RNA therapy that inhibits MiR-132. It is developed by Cardior Pharmaceuticals to treat heart failure.
