= Cyclotraxin B =

Chemical compound

Clinical data
- Other names: CTX-B
- ATC code: None

Identifiers
- IUPAC name: (3S,6R,11R,17S,20S,23S,26S,32S,35S)-6-amino-20-(4-aminobutyl)-3-(2-amino-2-oxoethyl)-17-(2-carboxyethyl)-23-[(1R)-1-hydroxyethyl]-26-[(4-hydroxyphenyl)methyl]-32-(2-methylsulfanylethyl)-2,5,13,16,19,22,25,28,31,34-decaoxo-8,9-dithia-1,4,12,15,18,21,24,27,30,33-decazabicyclo[33.3.0]octatriacontane-11-carboxylic acid
- CAS Number: 1203586-72-4
- PubChem CID: 90489002
- ChemSpider: 29785020
- CompTox Dashboard (EPA): DTXSID501045820

Chemical and physical data
- Formula: C_{48}H_{73}N_{13}O_{17}S_{3}
- Molar mass: 1200.37 g·mol^{−1}
- 3D model (JSmol): Interactive image
- SMILES: CC(C1C(=O)NC(C(=O)NC(C(=O)NCC(=O)NC(CSSCC(C(=O)NC(C(=O)N2CCCC2C(=O)NC(C(=O)NCC(=O)NC(C(=O)N1)CC3=CC=C(C=C3)O)CCSC)CC(=O)N)N)C(=O)O)CCC(=O)O)CCCCN)O
- InChI: InChI=1S/C48H73N13O17S3/c1-24(62)39-46(75)58-28(6-3-4-15-49)43(72)56-29(12-13-38(67)68)41(70)52-21-37(66)55-33(48(77)78)23-81-80-22-27(50)40(69)59-32(19-35(51)64)47(76)61-16-5-7-34(61)45(74)57-30(14-17-79-2)42(71)53-20-36(65)54-31(44(73)60-39)18-25-8-10-26(63)11-9-25/h8-11,24,27-34,39,62-63H,3-7,12-23,49-50H2,1-2H3,(H2,51,64)(H,52,70)(H,53,71)(H,54,65)(H,55,66)(H,56,72)(H,57,74)(H,58,75)(H,59,69)(H,60,73)(H,67,68)(H,77,78)/t24-,27+,28+,29+,30+,31+,32+,33+,34+,39+/m1/s1; Key:JLBMMJHZUYBFGX-ZHTCEXBHSA-N

Cyclotraxin B (CTX-B) is a small (1200 Da) cyclic peptide and highly potent (IC_{50} = 0.30 nM), selective, and non-competitive antagonist or negative allosteric modulator of TrkB, the main receptor of brain-derived neurotrophic factor (BDNF). CTX-B was originally developed by Cazorla M. and colleagues at Université Paris and Inserm in 2010, mimicking a specific structural loop in BDNF known for its functional selectivity. Cyclotraxin-B's name originates from Cyclic trk inhibitor B.

CTX-B crosses the blood-brain-barrier with systemic administration and produces anxiolytic-like effects in animals, though notably not antidepressant-like effects. The compound has also been found to produce analgesic effects in animal models of neuropathic pain. In addition to TrkB, CTX-B has been found to be an allosteric modulator of VEGFR2, one of the receptors of vascular endothelial growth factor (VEGF).

== See also ==
- Tropomyosin receptor kinase B § Antagonists
