= Tropomyosin receptor kinase B =

Protein and coding gene in humans

NTRK2
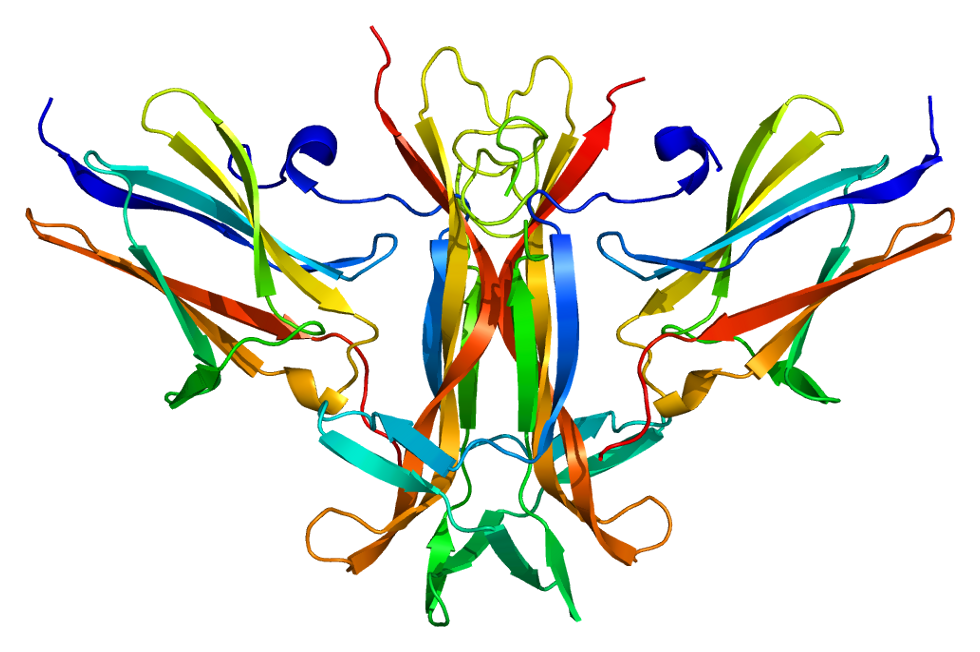

Identifiers
- Aliases: NTRK2, GP145-TrkB, TRKB, trk-B, neurotrophic receptor tyrosine kinase 2, OBHD, EIEE58
- External IDs: OMIM: 600456; MGI: 97384; GeneCards: NTRK2
Available structures
PDB	Ortholog search: PDBe RCSB
PDB	List of PDB id codes 4AT5, 1HCF, 1WWB, 2MFQ, 4ASZ, 4AT3, 4AT4
Enzyme activity
EC #	BRENDA	ExPASy	KEGG	MetaCyc
2.7.10.1	↗	↗	↗	↗

Gene location (Human)
Chr.	Chromosome 9 (human)
Band	9q21.33	Start	84,668,551 bp
Band	9q21.33	End	85,027,070 bp

Gene location (Mouse)
Chr.	Chromosome 13 (mouse)
Band	13 B1|13 31.2 cM	Start	58,954,383 bp
Band	13 B1|13 31.2 cM	End	59,281,784 bp
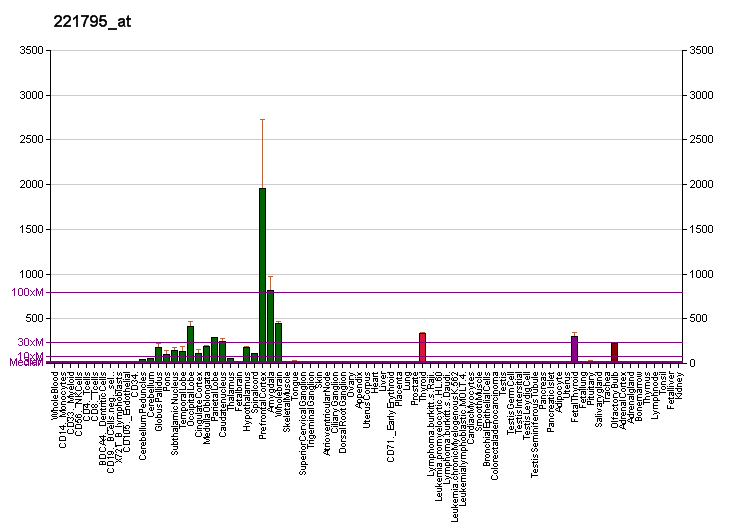

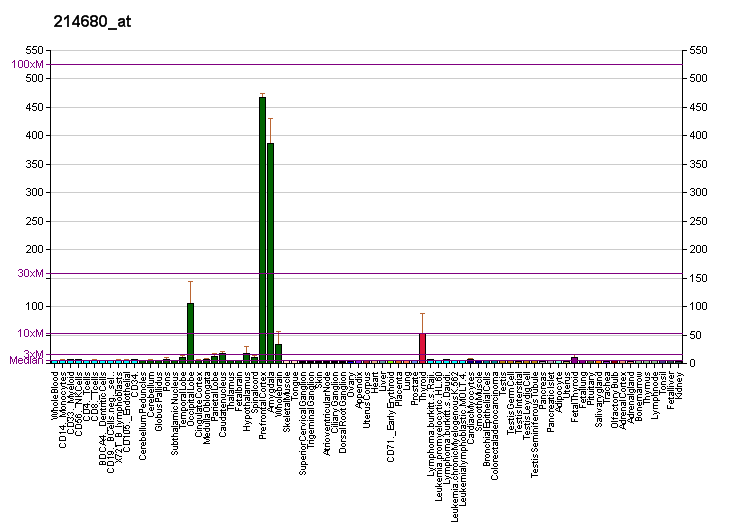

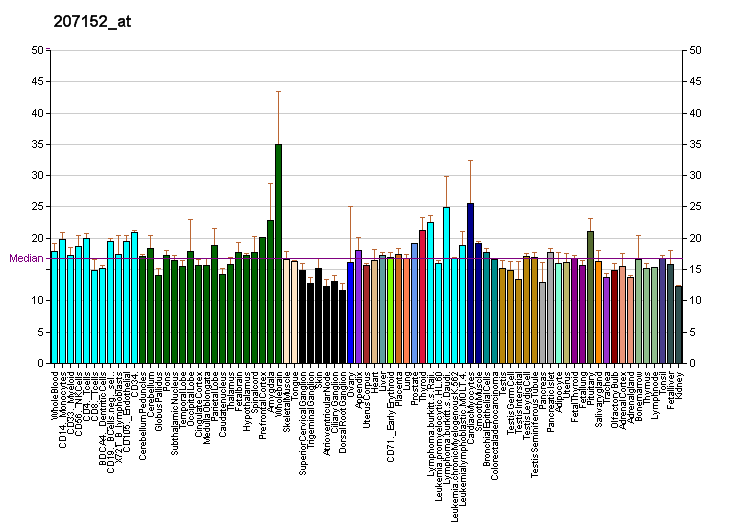
RNA expression pattern
Bgee	Human / Mouse (ortholog); Top expressed in: optic nerve; external globus pallidus; Region I of hippocampus proper; internal globus pallidus; Epithelium of choroid plexus; superior vestibular nucleus; dorsal motor nucleus of vagus nerve; ventral tegmental area; postcentral gyrus; pars reticulata / Top expressed in: median eminence; arcuate nucleus; dorsomedial hypothalamic nucleus; lateral septal nucleus; superior frontal gyrus; substantia nigra; subiculum; anterior amygdaloid area; dorsal tegmental nucleus; Epithelium of choroid plexus; More reference expression data
BioGPS	More reference expression data
Gene ontology
Molecular function	neurotrophin binding; neurotrophin receptor activity; kinase activity; transmembrane receptor protein tyrosine kinase activity; ATP binding; protein kinase activity; brain-derived neurotrophic factor binding; transferase activity; protein homodimerization activity; protein tyrosine kinase activity; nucleotide binding; brain-derived neurotrophic factor-activated receptor activity; protein binding; receptor tyrosine kinase; transmembrane signaling receptor activity
Cellular component	cytosol; endosome; postsynaptic membrane; membrane; terminal bouton; integral component of membrane; receptor complex; endosome membrane; integral component of plasma membrane; postsynaptic density; early endosome; early endosome membrane; plasma membrane; axon; dendrite; perinuclear region of cytoplasm; cytoplasm; cell projection; dendritic spine; axon terminus; Golgi membrane
Biological process	negative regulation of neuron apoptotic process; peripheral nervous system neuron development; positive regulation of protein phosphorylation; oligodendrocyte differentiation; learning; positive regulation of axonogenesis; vasculogenesis; protein phosphorylation; central nervous system neuron development; neuromuscular junction development; retinal rod cell development; circadian rhythm; feeding behavior; regulation of GTPase activity; positive regulation of peptidyl-serine phosphorylation; brain-derived neurotrophic factor receptor signaling pathway; regulation of protein kinase B signaling; regulation of metabolic process; positive regulation of MAPK cascade; cell differentiation; phosphorylation; neuron migration; mechanoreceptor differentiation; nervous system development; glutamate secretion; retina development in camera-type eye; neuron differentiation; cerebral cortex development; negative regulation of anoikis; multicellular organism development; positive regulation of gene expression; positive regulation of cell population proliferation; positive regulation of neuron projection development; cellular response to amino acid stimulus; positive regulation of phosphatidylinositol 3-kinase signaling; peptidyl-tyrosine phosphorylation; long-term potentiation; positive regulation of synapse assembly; transmembrane receptor protein tyrosine kinase signaling pathway; protein autophosphorylation; trans-synaptic signaling by neuropeptide, modulating synaptic transmission; activation of phospholipase C activity; neurotrophin TRK receptor signaling pathway; positive regulation of non-membrane spanning protein tyrosine kinase activity; trans-synaptic signaling by BDNF, modulating synaptic transmission; negative regulation of signal transduction; neuronal action potential propagation; myelination in peripheral nervous system; negative regulation of apoptotic process; positive regulation of ERK1 and ERK2 cascade; cellular response to nerve growth factor stimulus; regulation of MAPK cascade; cellular response to brain-derived neurotrophic factor stimulus
Sources:Amigo / QuickGO
Orthologs
Databases	NCBI: entry; OMA: entry
Species	Human	Mouse
Entrez	4915	18212
Ensembl	ENSG00000148053	ENSMUSG00000055254
UniProt	Q16620	P15209
RefSeq (mRNA)	NM_001007097; NM_001018064; NM_001018065; NM_001018066; NM_001291937 NM_006180	NM_001025074; NM_008745; NM_001282961
RefSeq (protein)	NP_001007098; NP_001018074; NP_001018075; NP_001018076; NP_001278866 NP_006171; NP_001356461; NP_001356462; NP_001356463; NP_001356464; NP_001356465; NP_001356466; NP_001356467; NP_001356468; NP_001356469; NP_001356470; NP_001356471; NP_001356472; NP_001356473; NP_001356474; NP_001356475; NP_001356476; NP_001356477; NP_001356478; NP_001356479; NP_001356480; NP_001356481	NP_001020245; NP_001269890; NP_032771
Location (UCSC)	Chr 9: 84.67 – 85.03 Mb	Chr 13: 58.95 – 59.28 Mb
PubMed search
- Wikidata
View/Edit Human	View/Edit Mouse

Tropomyosin receptor kinase B (TrkB), also known as tyrosine receptor kinase B, or BDNF/NT-3 growth factors receptor or neurotrophic tyrosine kinase, receptor, type 2 is a protein that in humans is encoded by the NTRK2 gene. TrkB is a receptor for brain-derived neurotrophic factor (BDNF).

== Function ==
Tropomyosin receptor kinase B is the high-affinity catalytic receptor for several "neurotrophins", small protein growth factors that induce the survival and differentiation of distinct cell populations. The neurotrophins that activate TrkB are: BDNF (Brain Derived Neurotrophic Factor), neurotrophin-4 (NT-4), and neurotrophin-3 (NT-3). As such, TrkB mediates the multiple effects of these neurotrophic factors, which include neuronal differentiation and survival.

The TrkB receptor is part of the large family of receptor tyrosine kinases. A tyrosine kinase is an enzyme capable of adding a phosphate group to certain tyrosines on target proteins or substrates. A receptor tyrosine kinase is a tyrosine kinase located at the cellular membrane, and is activated by the binding of a ligand to the receptor's extracellular domain. Other examples of tyrosine kinase receptors include the insulin receptor, the IGF1 receptor, the MuSK protein receptor, the Vascular Endothelial Growth Factor (or VEGF) receptor, etc.

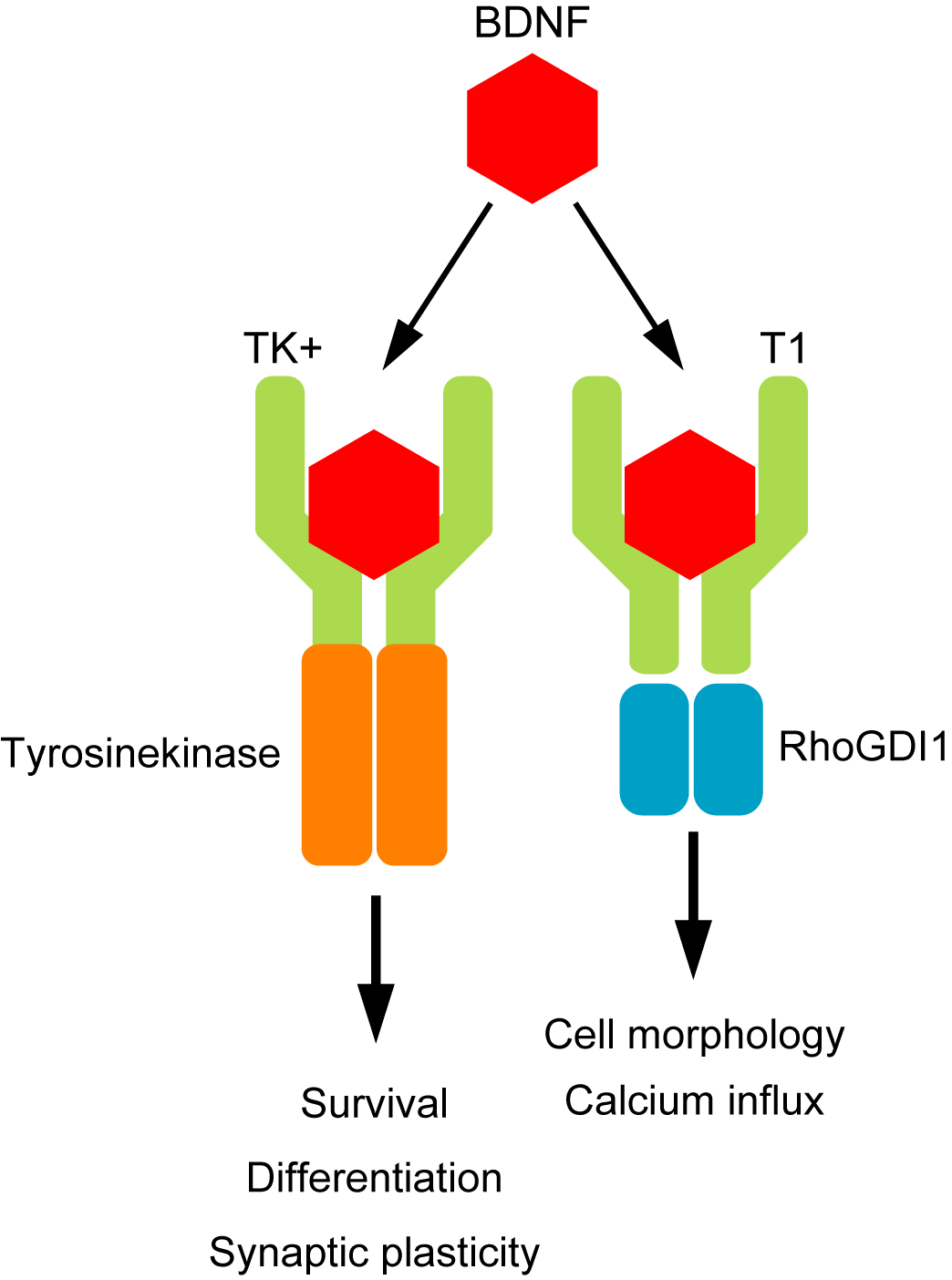
TrkB signaling

Currently, there are three TrkB isoforms in the mammalian CNS. The full-length isoform (TK+) is a typical tyrosine kinase receptor and transduces the BDNF signal via Ras-ERK, PI3K, and PLCγ. In contrast, two truncated isoforms (TK-: T1 and T2) possess the same extracellular domain, transmembrane domain, and first 12 intracellular amino acid sequences as TK+. However, the C-terminal sequences are isoform-specific (11 and 9 amino acids, respectively).

BDNF binding initiates TrkB dimerization and trans-autophosphorylation, revealing binding sites for PLCγ and Shc proteins. When PLCγ binds to TrkB, PIP_{2} is hydrolyzed into IP_{3} and DAG. IP_{3} binds to the endoplasmic reticulum, inducing calcium release, while DAG stimulates Protein Kinase C (PKC). PKC activation is implicated in neuronal plasticity and survival, among other effects. Shc binding recruits PI3K, which promotes AKT and MAPK/ERK signaling cascades involved in dendritogenesis, cellular differentiation, and proliferation.

TrkB.T1 isoforms prevent autophosphorylation, limiting full-length TrkB signaling and its associated effects on neuronal plasticity. However, TrkB.T1 has separate signaling pathways in astrocytes and glial cells, regulating calcium influx and cell morphology. Disease states associated with overexpression of TrkB.T1 include ischemia, stroke, spinal cord injury, neurodegenerative disorders, and chronic pain.

== Family members ==
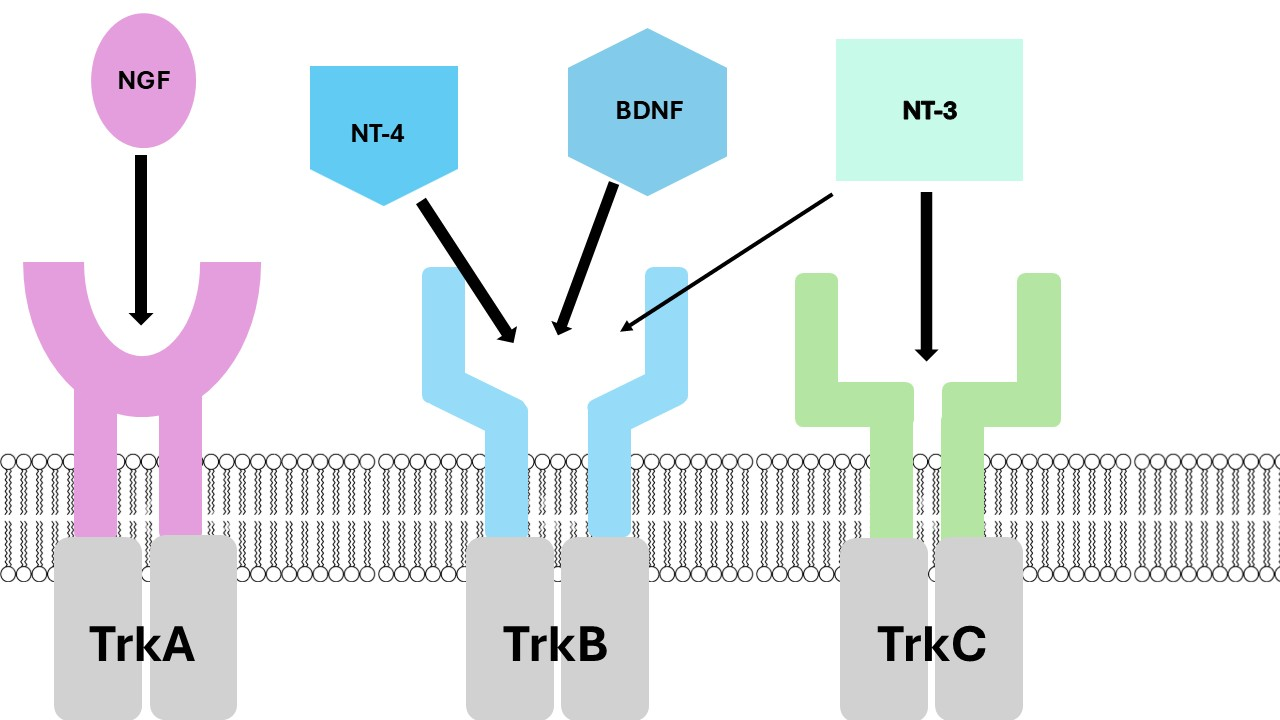
Tropomyosin kinase receptor family members and their endogenous ligands.

TrkB is part of a sub-family of protein kinases which includes also TrkA and TrkC. There are other neurotrophic factors structurally related to BDNF: NGF (for nerve growth factor), NT-3 (for neurotrophin-3) and NT-4 (for neurotrophin-4). While TrkB mediates the effects of BDNF, NT-4 and NT-3, TrkA is bound and thereby activated only by NGF. Further, TrkC binds and is activated by NT-3.

TrkB binds BDNF and NT-4 more strongly than it binds NT-3. NT-3 has a greater binding affinity for TrkC than TrkB.

== Clinical Implications ==
=== Cancer ===
Although originally identified as an oncogenic fusion in 1982, only recently has there been a renewed interest in the Trk family as it relates to its role in human cancers because of the identification of NTRK1 (TrkA), NTRK2 (TrkB) and NTRK3 (TrkC) gene fusions and other oncogenic alterations in a number of tumor types. A number of Trk inhibitors are (in 2015) in clinical trials and have shown early promise in shrinking human tumors.

=== Neurodegenerative Diseases ===
TrkB and its ligand BDNF have been associated to both normal brain function and in the pathology and progression of Alzheimer's disease (AD) and other neurodegenerative disorders. First of all, BDNF/TrkB signalling has been implicated in long-term memory formation, the regulation of long-term potentiation, as well as hippocampal synaptic plasticity. In particular, neuronal activity has been shown to lead to an increase in TrkB mRNA transcription, as well as changes in TrkB protein trafficking, including receptor endocytosis or translocation. Both TrkB and BDNF are downregulated in the brain of early AD patients with mild cognitive impairments, while work in mice has shown that reducing TrkB levels in the brain of AD mouse models leads to a significant increase in memory deficits. In addition, combining the induction of adult hippocampal neurogenesis and increasing BDNF levels lead to an improved cognition, mimicking exercise benefits in AD mouse models. The effect of TrkB/BDNF signalling on AD pathology has been shown to be in part mediated by an increase in δ-secretase levels, via an upregulation of the JAK2/STAT3 pathway and C/EBPβ downstream of TrkB. Additionally, TrkB has been shown to reduce amyloid-β production by APP binding and phosphorylation, while TrkB cleavage by δ-secretase blocks normal TrkB activity. Dysregulation of the TrkB/BDNF pathway has been implicated in other neurological and neurodegenerative conditions, including stroke, Huntington's Disease, Parkinson's Disease, Amyotrophic lateral sclerosis and stress-related disorders.

=== Epilepsy ===
TrkB activation is implicated in KCC2 downregulation in the CNS. KCC2 cotransports potassium and chloride ions out of the cell. Chloride levels inside the cell remain low, so when GABAA receptors are activated, extracellular chloride can flow into the cell, inducing hyperpolarization. KCC2 downregulation causes intracellular Cl- accumulation, decreasing the electrochemical gradient that is critical for inhibitory GABA_{A} signaling. Altered inhibitory transmission caused by KCC2 downregulation is one mechanism implicated in epilepsy.

=== Depression ===
In the early 2020s, it was reported that some antidepressants, ketamine, and certain psychedelic drugs including LSD and psilocin interacted directly with TrkB and that this action might be involved in their antidepressant effects. However, subsequent studies with LSD and psilocin failed to reproduce these findings and instead found no interaction of these agents with TrkB.

=== Drug Targets ===
Entrectinib (formerly RXDX-101) is an investigational drug developed by Ignyta, Inc., which has potential antitumor activity. It is a selective pan-Trk receptor tyrosine kinase inhibitor (TKI) targeting gene fusions in TrkA, TrkB (this gene), and TrkC (respectively, coded by NTRK1, NTRK2, and NTRK3 genes) that is currently in phase 2 clinical testing. In addition, TrkB/BDNF signalling has been the target for developing novel drugs for Alzheimer's Disease, Parkinson's Disease or other neurodegenerative and psychiatric disorders, aiming at either pharmacological modulation of the pathway (e.g. small molecule mimetics) or other means (e.g. exercise induced changes in TrkB signalling).

== Ligands ==
=== Agonists ===
- 3,7-Dihydroxyflavone
- 3,7,8,2'-Tetrahydroxyflavone
- 7,3′-Dihydroxyflavone
- 7,8,2'-Trihydroxyflavone
- 7,8,3'-Trihydroxyflavone
- Amitriptyline
- BNN-20
- Braegen-02
- Brain-derived neurotrophic factor (BDNF)
- Deoxygedunin
- Diosmetin
- DMAQ-B1
- Eutropoflavin (4'-DMA-7,8-DHF)
- HIOC
- LM22A-4
- N-Acetylserotonin (NAS)
- Neurotrophin-3 (NT-3)
- Neurotrophin-4 (NT-4)
- Norwogonin (5,7,8-THF)
- R7 (prodrug of tropoflavin)
- R13 (BrAD-R13; Braegen-01; prodrug of tropoflavin)
- SPV-400
- TDP6
- Tropoflavin (7,8-DHF)

=== Antagonists ===
- ANA-12
- Cyclotraxin B
- Gossypetin (3,5,7,8,3',4'-HHF)

=== Positive allosteric modulators ===
- ACD856 (nanomolar range)
- Ponazuril (ACD855) (micromolar range)

Antidepressants like fluoxetine, imipramine, and others (micromolar range), dissociatives and related compounds like ketamine (micromolar range) and (2R,6R)-hydroxynorketamine (nanomolar range), and serotonergic psychedelics and related drugs like LSD, psilocin, and lisuride (nanomolar range) have all been reported to act as positive allosteric modulators of TrkB. However, subsequent studies with LSD and psilocin failed to replicate these findings and instead found no interactions of these drugs with TrkB.

=== Others ===
- Dehydroepiandrosterone (DHEA)

== Interactions ==
TrkB has been shown to interact with:

- Brain-derived neurotrophic factor (BDNF),
- FYN,
- NCK2,
- PLCG1,
- Sequestosome 1, and
- SHC3.

== See also ==
- Trk receptor
