= Perosamine =

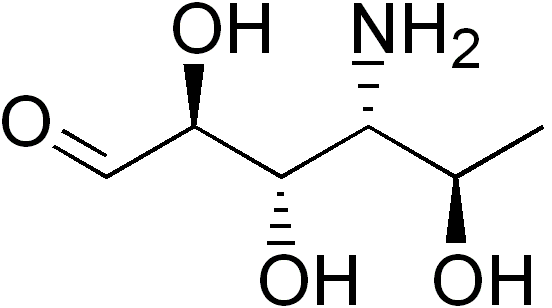

Names
- IUPAC name 4-Amino-4,6-dideoxy-D-mannose
- Systematic IUPAC name (2S,3S,4R,5R)-4-Amino-2,3,5-trihydroxyhexanal

Identifiers
CAS Number	31348-80-8
3D model (JSmol)	Interactive image
ChemSpider	142026
PubChem CID	161706
UNII	73JD8O473G
CompTox Dashboard (EPA)	DTXSID30185273
- InChI: InChI=1S/C6H13NO4/c1-3(9)5(7)6(11)4(10)2-8/h2-6,9-11H,7H2,1H3/t3-,4-,5-,6-/m1/s1 Key: UEHGPSGGFKLPTD-KVTDHHQDSA-N; InChI=1/C6H13NO4/c1-3(9)5(7)6(11)4(10)2-8/h2-6,9-11H,7H2,1H3/t3-,4-,5-,6-/m1/s1 Key: UEHGPSGGFKLPTD-KVTDHHQDBX
- SMILES: C[C@H]([C@H]([C@@H]([C@@H](C=O)O)O)N)O

Properties
Chemical formula	C_{6}H_{13}NO_{4}
Molar mass	163.172 g/mol
- Except where otherwise noted, data are given for materials in their standard state (at 25 °C [77 °F], 100 kPa). verify (what is ?) Infobox references

Perosamine (or GDP-perosamine) is a mannose-derived 4-aminodeoxysugar produced by some bacteria.

== Biological role ==
N-acetyl-perosamine is found in the O-antigen of Gram-negative bacteria such as Vibrio cholerae O1, E. coli O157:H7 and Caulobacter crescentus CB15. The sugar is also found in perimycin, an antibiotic produced by the Gram-positive organism Streptomyces coelicolor var. aminophilus.

== Biosynthesis ==
Its biosynthesis from mannose-1-phosphate follows a pathway similar to that of colitose, but is different in that it is aminated and does not undergo 3-OH deoxygenation or C-5 epimerization.

=== GDP-4-keto-6-deoxymannose-4-aminotransferase (GDP-perosamine synthase) ===
GDP-perosamine synthase is a PLP-dependent enzyme that transfers a nitrogen from glutamate to the 4-keto position of GDP-4-keto-6-deoxymannose during the biosynthesis of GDP-perosamine.
