= Neurotrophin-4 =

Protein-coding gene in the species Homo sapiens

NTF4

Identifiers
- Aliases: NTF4, GLC10, GLC1O, NT-4, NT-4/5, NT-5, NT4, NT5, NTF5, neurotrophin 4
- External IDs: OMIM: 162662; MGI: 97381; GeneCards: NTF4
Available structures
PDB	Ortholog search: PDBe RCSB
PDB	List of PDB id codes 1HCF, 1B8M, 1B98

Gene location (Human)
Chr.	Chromosome 19 (human)
Band	19q13.33	Start	49,061,066 bp
Band	19q13.33	End	49,065,076 bp

Gene location (Mouse)
Chr.	Chromosome 7 (mouse)
Band	7 B3|7 29.3 cM	Start	45,063,119 bp
Band	7 B3|7 29.3 cM	End	45,066,603 bp
RNA expression pattern
Bgee	Human / Mouse (ortholog); Top expressed in: testicle; skeletal muscle tissue; skin of abdomen; muscle of thigh; skin of leg; gonad; prostate; mucosa of esophagus; gastrocnemius muscle; minor salivary glands / Top expressed in: hand; Gonadal ridge; molar; sternocleidomastoid muscle; tibialis anterior muscle; upper arm; knee joint; triceps brachii muscle; urothelium; vas deferens; More reference expression data
BioGPS	n/a
Gene ontology
Molecular function	neurotrophin p75 receptor binding; signaling receptor binding; protein binding; growth factor activity
Cellular component	cytoplasmic vesicle; extracellular region; extracellular space; synaptic vesicle; axon; dendrite
Biological process	negative regulation of neuron apoptotic process; regulation of neuron differentiation; adult locomotory behavior; sensory organ boundary specification; cell-cell signaling; neuron projection morphogenesis; innervation; negative regulation of cell death; long-term memory; taste bud development; mechanoreceptor differentiation; transmembrane receptor protein tyrosine kinase signaling pathway; ganglion mother cell fate determination; epidermis development; regulation of signaling receptor activity; activation of phospholipase C activity; neurotrophin TRK receptor signaling pathway; peripheral nervous system development; memory; nerve development; nerve growth factor signaling pathway; modulation of chemical synaptic transmission
Sources:Amigo / QuickGO
Orthologs
Databases	NCBI: entry; OMA: entry
Species	Human	Mouse
Entrez	4909	78405
Ensembl	ENSG00000225950	ENSMUSG00000074121
UniProt	P34130	Q80VU4
RefSeq (mRNA)	NM_006179; NM_001395489	NM_198190
RefSeq (protein)	NP_006170	NP_937833
Location (UCSC)	Chr 19: 49.06 – 49.07 Mb	Chr 7: 45.06 – 45.07 Mb
PubMed search
- Wikidata
View/Edit Human	View/Edit Mouse

Neurotrophin-4 (NT-4), also known as neurotrophin-5 (NT-5), is a protein that in humans is encoded by the NTF4 gene. It is a neurotrophic factor that signals predominantly through the TrkB receptor tyrosine kinase. NT-4 was first discovered and isolated from xenopus and viper in the year 1991 by Finn Hallbook et.al

== See also ==
- Tropomyosin receptor kinase B § Agonists
