= Gossypetin =

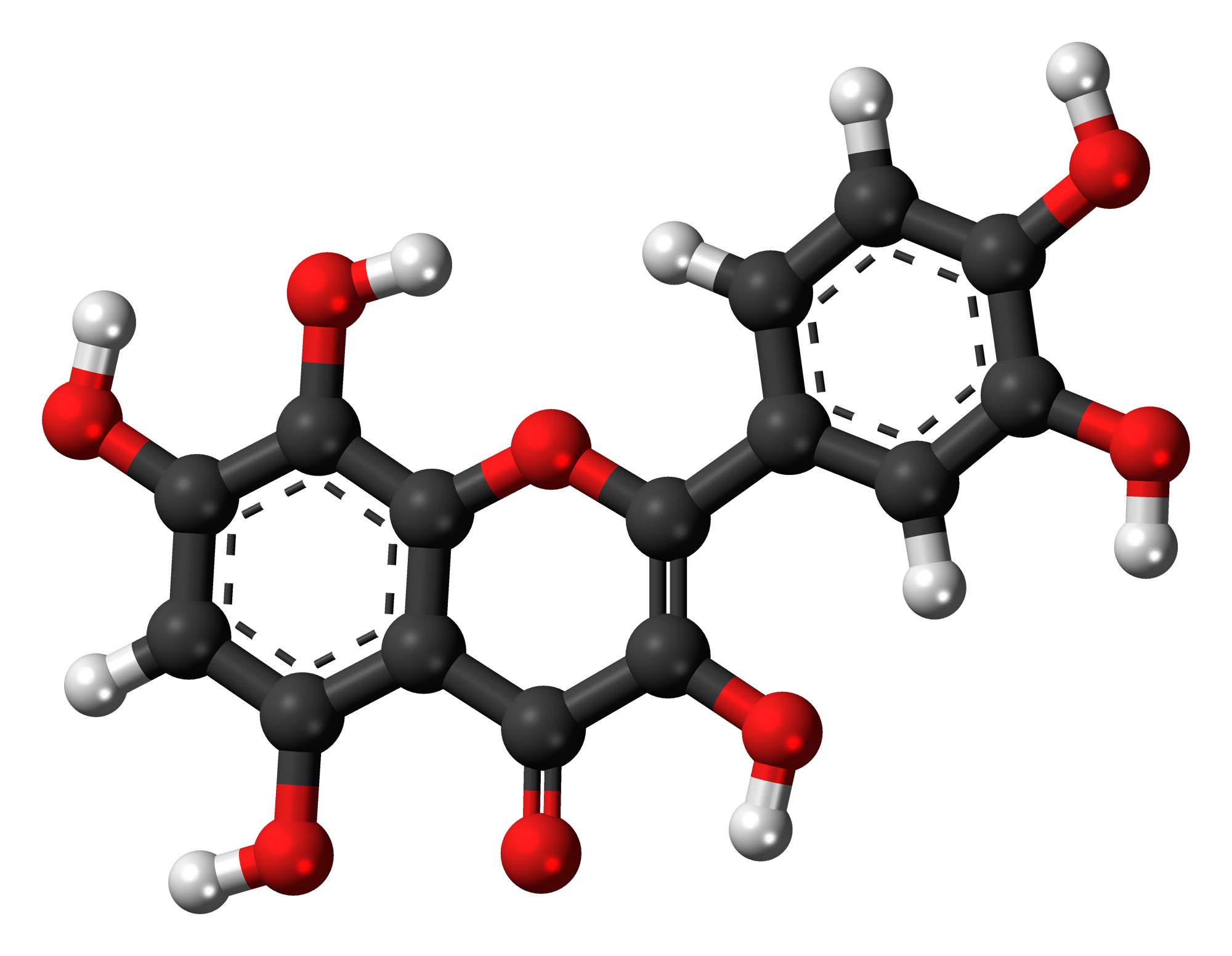

Names
- IUPAC name 3,3′,4′,5,7,8-Hexahydroxyflavone
- Systematic IUPAC name 2-(3,4-Dihydroxyphenyl)-3,5,7,8-tetrahydroxy-4H-1-benzopyran-4-one
- Other names Articulatidin; Equisporol; 3,5,7,8,3',4'-Hexahydroxyflavone

Identifiers
CAS Number	489-35-0
3D model (JSmol)	Interactive image
ChEBI	CHEBI:16400
ChEMBL	ChEMBL253570
ChemSpider	4444247
PubChem CID	5280647
UNII	SET4M23ZTM
CompTox Dashboard (EPA)	DTXSID50197631
- InChI: InChI=1S/C15H10O8/c16-6-2-1-5(3-7(6)17)14-13(22)12(21)10-8(18)4-9(19)11(20)15(10)23-14/h1-4,16-20,22H Key: YRRAGUMVDQQZIY-UHFFFAOYSA-N; InChI=1/C15H10O8/c16-6-2-1-5(3-7(6)17)14-13(22)12(21)10-8(18)4-9(19)11(20)15(10)23-14/h1-4,16-20,22H Key: YRRAGUMVDQQZIY-UHFFFAOYAI
- SMILES: C1=CC(=C(C=C1C2=C(C(=O)C3=C(O2)C(=C(C=C3O)O)O)O)O)O

Properties
Chemical formula	C_{15}H_{10}O_{8}
Molar mass	318.23 g/mol
- Except where otherwise noted, data are given for materials in their standard state (at 25 °C [77 °F], 100 kPa). verify (what is ?) Infobox references

Gossypetin, also known as 3,5,7,8,3',4'-hexahydroxyflavone, is a flavonol, a type of flavonoid. It has been isolated from the flowers and the calyx of Hibiscus sabdariffa (roselle) and exhibits a strong antibacterial activity. The compound has also been found to act as an antagonist of TrkB. Gossypetin has radioprotective activity.

The enzyme 8-hydroxyquercetin 8-O-methyltransferase uses S-adenosyl methionine and gossypetin to produce S-adenosylhomocysteine and 3,5,7,3',4'-pentahydroxy-8-methoxyflavone.

In 2022, a study in an animal model using intragastric administration suggested that the flavonoid gossypetin facilitated the clearance of beta-amyloid in the brain and is a promising target for the study of treatments for Alzheimer's Disease by enhancing microglial phagocytic activity against Aβ.

== See also ==
- Tropomyosin receptor kinase B § Antagonists
