= Perimycin =

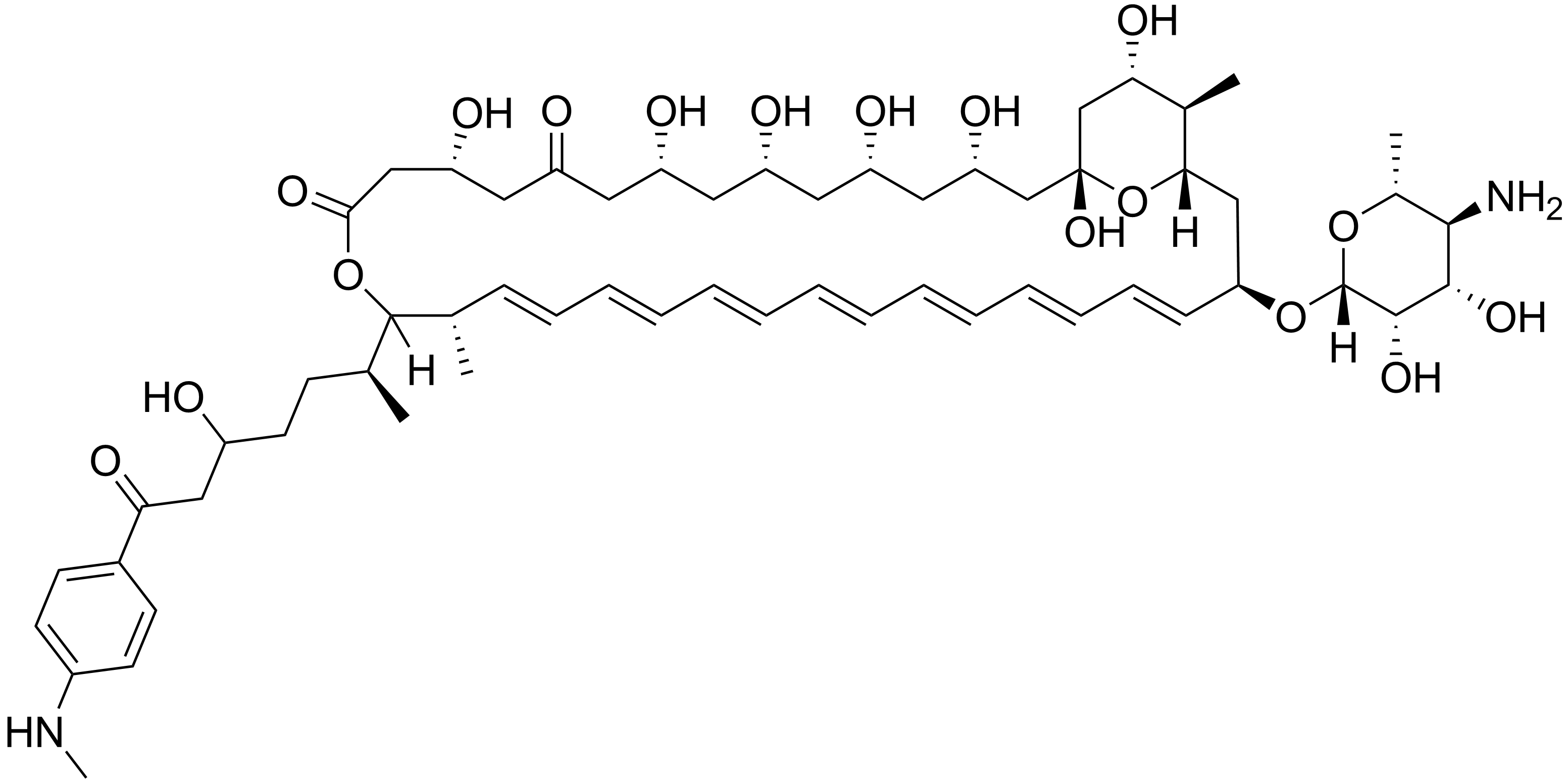

Names
- IUPAC name (1R,3S,5S,7R,9R,13R,17R,18S,19E,21E,23Z,25Z,27E,29E,31E,33R,35S,36R,37S)-33-[(2R,3S,4S,5S,6R)-5-amino-3,4-dihydroxy-6-methyloxan-2-yl]oxy-1,3,5,7,9,13,37-heptahydroxy-17-[(2S)-5-hydroxy-7-[4-(methylamino)phenyl]-7-oxoheptan-2-yl]-18,36-dimethyl-16,39-dioxabicyclo[33.3.1]nonatriaconta-19,21,23,25,27,29,31-heptaene-11,15-dione
- Other names 4ʼ-Amino-3ʼ-deamino-18-decarboxy-40-demethyl-4ʼ-deoxy-3,7-dideoxo-3,3ʼ,7-trihydroxy-N47,18,dimethyl-5-oxocandicidin-D-cyclic-15,19-hemiacetal

Identifiers
CAS Number	62327-61-1
3D model (JSmol)	Interactive image
ChemSpider	16736162
PubChem CID	10534218
UNII	J1A6A7WH82
- InChI: InChI=1S/C59H88N2O17/c1-36-18-16-14-12-10-8-6-7-9-11-13-15-17-19-49(76-58-56(73)55(72)54(60)39(4)75-58)33-52-38(3)51(70)35-59(74,78-52)34-48(68)30-46(66)28-44(64)26-43(63)27-45(65)29-47(67)32-53(71)77-57(36)37(2)20-25-42(62)31-50(69)40-21-23-41(61-5)24-22-40/h6-19,21-24,36-39,42-44,46-49,51-52,54-58,61-64,66-68,70,72-74H,20,25-35,60H2,1-5H3/b7-6-,10-8-,11-9+,14-12+,15-13+,18-16+,19-17+/t36-,37-,38+,39+,42?,43+,44-,46-,47+,48-,49-,51-,52-,54+,55-,56-,57-,58-,59+/m0/s1 Key: SIJFZOSSGXKJCI-FTNWOYNKSA-N
- SMILES: O=C1C[C@@H](O)CC(OC([C@@H](C)CCC(O)CC(C4=CC=C(NC)C=C4)=O)([H])[C@@H](C)/C=C/C=C/C=C/C=C/C=C/C=C/C=C/[C@H](O[C@@]3([H])[C@@H](O)[C@@H](O)[C@H](N)[C@@H](C)O3)C[C@]([C@H](C)[C@@H](O)C2)([H])O[C@@]2(O)C[C@@H](O)C[C@@H](O)C[C@@H](O)C[C@@H](O)C1)=O

Properties
Chemical formula	C_{59}H_{88}N_{2}O_{17}
Molar mass	1097.33 g/mol
Appearance	Amorphous, golden-yellow solid
Melting point	Indefinite
- Except where otherwise noted, data are given for materials in their standard state (at 25 °C [77 °F], 100 kPa). verify (what is ?) Infobox references

Perimycin, also known as aminomycin and fungimycin, is polyene antibiotic produced by Streptomyces coelicolor var. aminophilus. The compound exhibits antifungal properties.

== Composition ==
Perimycin is produced naturally as a mixture of three types: A, B and C, with type A being the major component. All types consist of a polyketide core with a perosamine sugar moiety. The variations occur at the end of the core opposite the perosamine moiety. Perimycin A has an aromatic group in this position, whereas the identities of the analogous groups in the other perimycin types are currently undetermined.

== Usage ==
Polyene antibiotics in general are often toxic to humans and have poor bioavailability. Thus, with the notable exception of amphotericin B, they are often not used clinically. Perimycin has been shown to be an effective antifungal compound, but is not widely used in clinical settings.
