= K252b =

Names
- IUPAC name (15S,16R,18R)-16-Hydroxy-15-methyl-3-oxo-28-oxa-4,14,19-triazaoctacyclo[12.11.2.115,18.02,6.07,27.08,13.019,26.020,25]octacosa-1,6,8,10,12,20,22,24,26-nonaene-16-carboxylic acid

Identifiers
| CAS Number | 99570-78-2 |
| 3D model (JSmol) | Interactive image |
| ChEBI | CHEBI:208814 |
| ChEMBL | ChEMBL140600; ChEMBL4750633 |
| ChemSpider | 8156936 |
| PubChem CID | 3814; 9981344; 9846716 |
| CompTox Dashboard (EPA) | 90433626 |
- InChI: InChI=1S/C26H19N3O5/c1-25-26(33,24(31)32)10-17(34-25)28-15-8-4-2-6-12(15)19-20-14(11-27-23(20)30)18-13-7-3-5-9-16(13)29(25)22(18)21(19)28/h2-9,17,33H,10-11H2,1H3,(H,27,30)(H,31,32)/t17-,25+,26+/m1/s1 Key: AMSOPBXQXSAAAC-PLZPTFKGSA-N
- SMILES: C[C@@]12[C@](C[C@@H](O1)N3C4=CC=CC=C4C5=C6C(=C7C8=CC=CC=C8N2C7=C53)CNC6=O)(C(=O)O)O

Properties
| Chemical formula | C_{26}H_{19}N_{3}O_{5} |
| Molar mass | 453.454 g·mol^{−1} |
| Appearance | White to light yellow powder |
| Solubility | soluble in DMSO, methanol |
- Except where otherwise noted, data are given for materials in their standard state (at 25 °C [77 °F], 100 kPa). Infobox references

K252b is an ectoprotein kinase inhibitor, which is involved in the abolishment of the effects of nerve growth factors on PC12 cell and peripheral neuron system (PNS) neurons. When it is present in very low concentrations, it prolongs the survivorship of hippocampal, septal and cortical neurons deprived of glucose.

K252b is related to K252a and staurosporine, which are low-molecular-weight alkaloids. Staurosporine was discovered in 1977 while screening for microbial alkaloids using chemical detection methods. K252 was discovered in 1986 as a related natural indolocarbazole product. In 2007, K252b was found to have an inhibitory effect on mycobacterial protein kinase PknB. This is a receptor-like transmembrane protein. The PknB gene can be found in all known mycobacterial genomes. Staurosporine and K252a have inhibitory effects on the growth of Mycobacterium tuberculosis, but K252b failed to inhibit bacterial growth.

== Metabolism ==
The metabolism of K252b, a complex organic molecule, is caused by interactions between the molecule and various metabolic pathways in different living organisms, microorganisms and animals are among these organisms.

== Uses ==
=== In influencing NGF and neurite outgrowth ===
K252b controls neurite formation by inhibiting Nerve Growth Factor(NGF)-induced neurite outgrowth of PC12 cells. This inhibition is dose-dependent with higher concentrations of K252b leading to more NGF-induced neurite outgrowth inhibition. The exact mechanism of K252b inhibition of NGF-induced neurite outgrowth is still largely unknown.

=== In synapse formation ===
Continuous application of K252b also dose-dependently inhibits the formation of synapses in the cultured cortical neurons of rat brains, with higher doses resulting in higher inhibition. K252b does this by suppressing phosphorylation of the extracellular domains of proteins, mainly the microtubule-associated protein (MAP) 1B is sensitive to the inhibiting effects of K252b. Additionally, K252b application causes a significant drop in the frequency of synchronous firing of cultured cortical neurons of rats.

=== In immune response processes ===
K252b inhibits the immune response of mast cells and human basophil cells in several ways. Inhibition of the mast cell and human basophil immune response by involvement of ectokinase K252b in IgE-receptor mediated signaling has been speculated to function as a suppressor of acute allergic reactions. K252b's inhibition is dose-dependent, with higher concentrations of K252b resulting in more inhibition. The role of K252b in suppressing the immune response lies mainly in preventing cytosolic Ca^{2+} increase and preventing degranulation and histamine release in mast cells and human basophils.

==== Effects of K252b on cytosolic Ca^{2+} concentrations ====
K252b inhibits Ca^{2+} cytosolic concentration increases. K252b does this by inhibiting the Ca^{2+} influx from extracellular fluid and Ca^{2+} release from intracellular storage, therefore preventing the increase of the Ca^{2+} cytosolic concentration, which is an essential step in the process of activation of the immune response of mast cells and human basophil cells.

==== Effects on degranulation and histamine release of mast cells and human basophils ====
K252b inhibits basophil and mast-cell histamine release induced by both Ag and BA3. Additionally, K252b dose-dependently inhibits Ag induced β-hexosaminidase release. K252b also inhibits IgE receptor-mediated degranulation of mast cells, in this process K252b acts at a very early stage of IgE receptor-mediated stimulation, which according to Teshima et al. means that the target for K252b is likely an early signaling molecule active in the process of IgE receptor mediation. K252b also suppresses the IgE receptor-mediated histamine release and to a lower extent also 150 nM TPA mediated histamine release in mast cells and human basophil cells. Degranulation is, like increase in the cytosolic Ca^{2+} concentration, an essential step in the activation of the immune response of mast cells and human basophil cells.

== Efficacy ==
=== In general ===
K252b has been shown to have a higher efficacy at higher doses, making its inhibiting processes dose dependent. Since K252b does not permeate the cell membrane of the cells it acts upon, due to its hydrophilic nature, K252b generally has a low cytotoxicity and leaves less cytotoxic damage than its membrane-permeating analogs like K252a.

=== In the process of NGF-induced neurite outgrowth inhibition ===
K252b has been shown to entirely inhibit NGF-induced neurite outgrowth at concentrations of 300 nM, while K252b concentrations of 100 nM or less result in a partial inhibition.

== Toxicology data ==
The CC_{50} was reported to be less than 40 μM against murine macrophage J774A.1 measured by AlamarBlue assay.

== Structure, reactivity, and synthesis ==
K252b is a large molecule which falls into the indolocarbozole category. K252b looks very much like another indolocarbazole: K252a. The difference between these 2 is that K252b possesses a carboxylic acid group where K252a has an ester instead. This difference makes K252b a lot more hydrophobic than K252a, the partition coefficient for K252b is 4.4:1 (org:aq) and 15.6:1 for K252a2. This difference in hydrophilicity has an impact on the uptake and concentration of K252b into cells. K252b is taken up reversibly by PC12 and Sf9 cells, whereas K252a is taken up irreversibly at a higher concentration.

One path to synthesize K252b, would be to synthesize K252a first and then react K252a with a strong base. K252a has been synthesized in many papers, there is no known route to directly synthesize K252b yet.

== Molecular mechanism of action ==
K252b inhibits tyrosine kinase receptors and the long-term trophic effects of NT-3 and BDNF at concentrations above 100 nM. At concentrations under 100 nM it stimulates the trophic effects of NT-3.

== See also ==
- K252a
