= MiR-132 =

Non-coding RNA molecule

miR-132
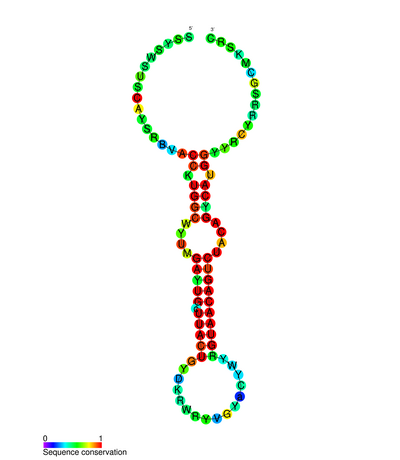
- miR-132 microRNA precursor secondary structure and sequence conservation.

Identifiers
- Symbol: miR-132
- Rfam: RF00662
- miRBase family: MIPF0000065
- NCBI Gene: 406921
- HGNC: 31516
- OMIM: 610016

Other data
- RNA type: microRNA
- Domain(s): Eukaryota;
- PDB structures: PDBe

In molecular biology miR-132 microRNA is a short non-coding RNA molecule. MicroRNAs function to regulate the expression levels of other genes by several mechanisms, generally reducing protein levels through the cleavage of mRNAs or the repression of their translation. Several targets for miR-132 have been described, including mediators of neurological development, synaptic transmission, inflammation and angiogenesis.

== Expression ==
miR-132 arises from the miR-212/132 cluster located in the intron of a non-coding gene on mouse chromosome 11. The transcription of this cluster was found to be enhanced by the transcription factor CREB (cAMP-response element binding protein). In neuronal cells BDNF (brain derived neurotrophic factor) is known to induce the transcription of this cluster; the pathway is thought to involve the BDNF-mediated activation of ERK1/2, which in turn activates MSK, another kinase enzyme. MSK-mediated phosphorylation of a serine residue on CREB may then enhance production of miR-132. MSK knockout mice still produce miR-132 in response to BDNF, but at a significantly lower level, indicating that there may be an alternative pathway operating. Activators of CREB phosphorylation, for instance forskolin and KSHV binding to endothelial cell targets, can also enhance miR-132 production in vitro. miR-132 levels are increased post-seizure, which strongly suggests a causal relationship between neuronal activation and miR-132 transcription. One example of this phenomenon is in the suprachiasmatic nucleus, where miR-132 is thought be involved in resetting the circadian clock in response to light. Inflammatory mediators such as Lipopolysaccharide (LPS) are also implicated in inducing miR-132 expression.

== Role in neuronal cells ==
miR-132 is enriched in neuronal cells. Recognition elements for this miRNA have been identified in a number of cellular mRNAs. One such mRNA is that of p250GAP, a GTPase activating protein linked to neuronal differentiation. miR-132 and its recognition site on p250GAP mRNA are highly conserved among vertebrates, and their interaction is suspected to have a role in vertebrate neurogenesis. By decreasing the levels of p250GAP, miR-132 promotes neuronal outgrowth and sprouting.

Another target for miR-132 is MeCP2, whose mRNA is expressed as a 'long' variant in neuronal cells. This variant contains a recognition element for miR-132 in its extended 3'UTR. miRNA-132 may be involved in a homeostatic mechanism that regulates MeCP2 levels in the brain. MeCP2 increases the levels of BDNF in the brain, which in turn will increase transcription from the miR-212/132 cluster. A rise in miRNA-132 level will then decrease the levels of MeCP2 and restore the balance. Failure to regulate MeCP2 levels is connected to neurological disorders including Rett syndrome.

The role of miR-132 in synaptic function is currently being studied. A BDNF-related increase in miR-132 is thought to bring about an increase in post-synaptic protein levels. miR-132 has been found to associate with Fragile X Mental Retardation Protein FMRP, and may be involved in the selection of mRNAs, including those regulating synaptic function, to undergo translational suppression via an FMRP-dependent mechanism.

miR-132 may also be responsible for limiting inflammation in the brain. A recognition sequence for this miRNA can be found in the mRNA for acetylcholinesterase (AChE), that degrades acetylcholine (ACh). By silencing the expression of AChE, ACh levels rise and inhibit peripheral inflammation.

== Infection and inflammation ==
Outside the brain, miR-132 can also modulate inflammation; transcription is stimulated by LPS and upregulated at a fairly early stage of herpesvirus infection. KSHV infection of endothelial cells, as well as HSV-1 or HCMV infection of monocytes, have been observed to induce this rise. In this instance, the target of translational suppression appears to be p300, a protein that associates with CREB and is an important mediator of antiviral immunity. By decreasing the levels of p300, the expression of IFN-β, ISG15, IL-1β and IL6 is impaired, resulting in the net suppression of antiviral immunity. miR-132 is only transiently induced following infection; the silencing of p300 results in a reduction in CREB-mediated transcription from the miR-212/132 cluster, thus forming a negative feedback loop.

Plasma from patients with rheumatoid arthritis (RA) has been found to contain lower levels of miR-132 compared to samples from healthy individuals. As RA is an autoimmune, inflammatory disease, it is possible that miR-132 helps to regulate inflammation in healthy joints.

Conversely, miR-132 has been implicated in promoting inflammation in adipocytes. The target for RNA silencing in this case is SirT1, a deacetylase enzyme. The p65 subunit of NF-κB is a SirT1 substrate; in the absence of SirT1 activity, NFκB is active, promoting inflammation and the production of the chemokines IL-8 and MCP-1. This process is implicated in the chronic inflammation that may underlie insulin resistance in the obese, and may occur in response to serum deprivation.

== Angiogenesis and cancer ==
miR-132 can induce the proliferation of endothelial cells and has been implicated in neovascularisation. Angiogenic factors such as VEGF and bFGF are CREB activators which could theoretically induce miR-132 production in endothelial cells. Here, the miRNA can silence the expression of p120RasGAP, fixing Ras in a GTP-bound, active conformation so as to induce proliferation. This angiogenic role could implicate miR-132 in oncogenesis, and this miRNA is known to be overexpressed in chronic lymphoblastic leukaemias. miR-132 also comprises part of the recently identified miRNA 'signature' of mammalian osteosarcoma, although a direct role in oncogenesis is yet to be fully described.

== Heart pathology ==
MiR-132 has been found to inhibit cardiac pathology in rodents. Overactivation of miR-132 upon various cardiac stress provokes adverse remodeling of the heart tissue that is implicated in the development and progression of heart failure (HF). The inhibition of miR-132 is a valid strategy in the prevention of heart failure progression in hypertrophic heart disease. CDR132L is the first-in-class synthetic antisense oligonucleotide inhibitor targeting miR-132, developed by Cardior Pharmaceuticals in the framework of the therapeutic strategy to bind abnormal levels of miR-132 to hold and reverse the development of detrimental cardiac remodeling. CDR132L is being currently investigated in a Phase 2 HF-REVERT Clinical Trial.

== Other targets ==
The Angiotensin II receptor type 1 mRNA also undergoes miR-132-mediated silencing. KIAA1211L is also a predicted miR-132 target.

== See also ==
- MicroRNA
