= Neurotrophic factor receptor =

Group of protein families

Neurotrophic factor receptors or neurotrophin receptors are a group of growth factor receptors which specifically bind to neurotrophins (neurotrophic factors).

Two classes of neurotrophic factor receptors are the p75 and the "Trk" families of tyrosine kinase receptors.

- p75 is a low affinity neurotrophin receptor, to which all neurotrophins bind. It is a member of the tumour necrosis super family. In some contexts, the phrase "x" only applies to this receptor.
- The Trk family include TrkA, TrkB, and TrkC, and will only bind with specific neurotrophins, but with a much higher affinity. The Trks mediate the functional signals of the neurotrophins.
- NGF binds to TrkA, BDNF and NT-4 bind to TrkB and NT-3 binds to TrkC. In addition NT-3 also binds to and activates TrkA and TrkB but it does so less efficiently.
- Whilst the Trk receptors have a clearly defined trophic role, p75 receptors activate signalling pathways which can also result in apoptosis.

== TrkA, B, and C receptors ==
TrkA mediates its actions by causing the addition of phosphate molecules on certain tyrosines in the cell, activating cellular signaling.

There are other related Trk receptors (TrkB and TrkC), and there are other neurotrophic factors structurally related to NGF (BDNF, NT-3, and NT-4)

- TrkA mediates the effects of NGF
- TrkB binds and is activated by BDNF, NT-4, and NT-3
- TrkC binds and is activated only by NT-3

== p75NTR receptor ==
The Low affinity nerve growth factor receptor commonly known as "p75", can signal for apoptosis or promote neuronal survival. Neurotrophins that interact with p75NTR include NGF, NT-3, BDNF, and NT-4/5. Neurotrophins activating p75NTR may initiate apoptosis (for example, via c-Jun N-terminal kinases signaling), and this effect can be counteracted by anti-apoptotic signaling by TrkA. Neurotrophin binding to p75NTR can promote neuronal survival (for example, via NF-kB activation).

Although NGF has been classically described as promoting neuron survival and differentiation, research performed in the early 2000s suggest that NGF with its prodomain attached (proNGF) can elicit apoptosis of cells that are positive for the LNGFR and negative for TrkA.

Secreted proNGF has been demonstrated in a variety of neuronal and non-neuronal cell populations. It has been proposed that secreted proNGF can elicit neuron death in a variety of neurodegenerative conditions, including Alzheimer's disease, following the observation of an increase of proNGF in the nucleus basalis of postmortem Alzheimer's brains.
