= NDFIP2 =

Protein-coding gene in the species Homo sapiens

Identifiers
- Aliases: NDFIP2, N4WBP5A, Nedd4 family interacting protein 2
- External IDs: OMIM: 610041; MGI: 1923523; HomoloGene: 12636; GeneCards: NDFIP2; OMA:NDFIP2 - orthologs

Gene location (Human)
| Chr. | Chromosome 13 (human) |
| Band | 13q31.1 | Start | 79,481,124 bp |
| Band | 13q31.1 | End | 79,556,077 bp |

Gene location (Mouse)
| Chr. | Chromosome 14 (mouse) |
| Band | 14|14 E2.3 | Start | 105,496,008 bp |
| Band | 14|14 E2.3 | End | 105,546,732 bp |
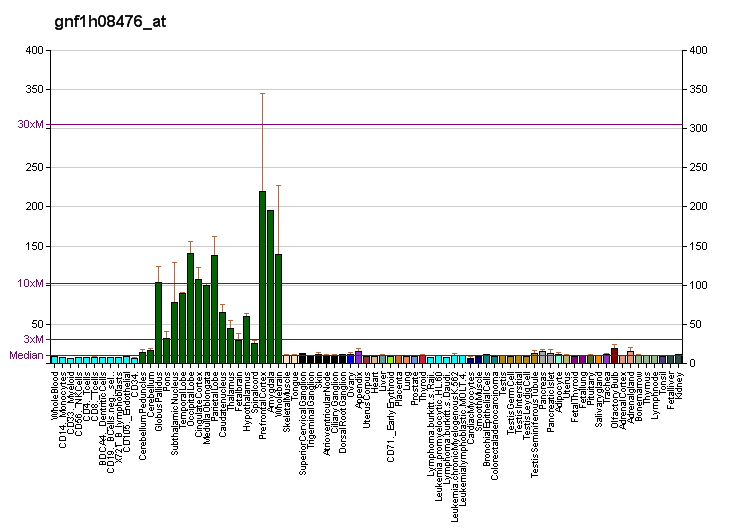
RNA expression pattern
| Bgee | Human / Mouse (ortholog); Top expressed in: secondary oocyte; skin of arm; sperm; pancreatic epithelial cell; Brodmann area 46; mucosa of ileum; skin of thigh; palpebral conjunctiva; jejunal mucosa; pons / Top expressed in: habenula; deep cerebellar nuclei; medial vestibular nucleus; olfactory tubercle; submandibular gland; ventral tegmental area; pontine nuclei; lateral geniculate nucleus; left colon; globus pallidus; More reference expression data |
| BioGPS | More reference expression data |
Gene ontology
| Molecular function | signal transducer activity; protein binding; WW domain binding |
| Cellular component | cytoplasm; integral component of membrane; endosome; Golgi apparatus; multivesicular body membrane; intracellular membrane-bounded organelle; membrane; Golgi membrane; endoplasmic reticulum; mitochondrion; perinuclear region of cytoplasm; endosome membrane |
| Biological process | negative regulation of gene expression; negative regulation of protein transport; positive regulation of I-kappaB kinase/NF-kappaB signaling; positive regulation of protein ubiquitination; negative regulation of transporter activity; signal transduction; vacuolar transport; metal ion transport |
Sources:Amigo / QuickGO
Orthologs
| Species | Human | Mouse |
| Entrez | 54602 | 76273 |
| Ensembl | ENSG00000102471 | ENSMUSG00000053253 |
| UniProt | Q9NV92 | Q91ZP6 |
| RefSeq (mRNA) | NM_001161407; NM_019080; NM_001394685 | NM_001190989; NM_029561 |
| RefSeq (protein) | NP_001154879; NP_061953 | n/a |
| Location (UCSC) | Chr 13: 79.48 – 79.56 Mb | Chr 14: 105.5 – 105.55 Mb |
| PubMed search |
- Wikidata
| View/Edit Human | View/Edit Mouse |

NEDD4 family-interacting protein 2 is a protein that in humans is encoded by the NDFIP2 gene.

== Interactions ==
NDFIP2 has been shown to interact with NEDD4.

Conversely, it has also been shown that NDFIP2 does not interact with the NEDD4-2 variant in neurons of the dorsal root ganglia, but it does participate in the regulation of TRKA, TRKB, and TRKC. This could indicate a direct relationship between NDFIP2 and the cellular mechanisms of nociception.
