= Eratrectinib =

Investigational drug

Clinical data
- Other names: VC004

Identifiers
- IUPAC name: (6R)-15-cyclopropyl-9-fluoro-2,11,15,16,20,21,24-heptazapentacyclo[16.5.2.02,6.07,12.021,25]pentacosa-1(24),7(12),8,10,18(25),19,22-heptaen-17-one
- CAS Number: 2396516-98-4
- PubChem CID: 146271223
- IUPHAR/BPS: 14070
- UNII: UP4C2TYD49

Chemical and physical data
- Formula: C_{21}H_{22}FN_{7}O
- Molar mass: 407.453 g·mol^{−1}
- 3D model (JSmol): Interactive image
- SMILES: C1C[C@@H]2C3=C(CCN(NC(=O)C4=C5N=C(N2C1)C=CN5N=C4)C6CC6)N=CC(=C3)F
- InChI: InChI=InChI=1S/C21H22FN7O/c22-13-10-15-17(23-11-13)5-8-28(14-3-4-14)26-21(30)16-12-24-29-9-6-19(25-20(16)29)27-7-1-2-18(15)27/h6,9-12,14,18H,1-5,7-8H2,(H,26,30)/t18-/m1/s1; Key:URXMBXJZRCIDQB-GOSISDBHSA-N

Eratrectinib is an investigational new drug that is being developed by Jiangsu Vcare Pharmatech for the treatment of solid tumors. It is a Trk receptor antagonist targeting specifically TRKA, TRKB and TRKC.

It has been approved in June 2026 for use in treating for solid tumors in China.
