= Mir-765 microRNA precursor family =

mir-765

Identifiers
- Symbol: mir-765
- Rfam: RF01027
- miRBase family: MIPF0000545

Other data
- RNA type: microRNA
- Domain(s): Eukaryota;
- PDB structures: PDBe

In molecular biology mir-765 microRNA is a short RNA molecule. MicroRNAs function to regulate the expression levels of other genes by several mechanisms.

== Traumatic Brain Injury ==
miR-765 has been identified as a diagnostic marker for traumatic brain injury (TBI), due to significantly elevated levels in the plasma of TBI patients. Furthermore, combination with either miR-16 or miR-92a allows extremely accurate distinction between TBI patients and healthy controls.

== miR-765 and pheochromocytomas ==
Increased miR-765 expression is observed in Von Hippel-Lindau disease compared with the sporadic benign forms of pheochromocytomas. It has been linked to neuronal plasticity through the neurotrophic tyrosine kinase receptor type 3 (NTRK3) gene. A NTRK3 3'UTR variant, ss102661458, is located in a functional target site of miR-765 and is able to significantly affect miRNA-mediated NTRK3 regulation. Through this there is restoration of the altered gene expression by miR-765. NTRK3 is underexpressed with high or overexpressed levels of miR-765, thus pointing towards a possible involvement of this relationship in pheochromocytoma pathogenesis.

== See also ==
- MicroRNA
