= Peter Fecci =

American neurosurgeon and teacher (born 1977)

Peter Edward Fecci
- Occupations: Neurosurgeon and academic

Academic background
- Education: Bachelor of Science; Doctor of Medicine; Doctor of Philosophy
- Alma mater: Cornell University; Duke University

Academic work
- Institutions: Duke University; University of Colorado School of Medicine

Peter Edward Fecci is a neurosurgeon and academic. He is a professor of neurosurgery and pathology at Duke University School of Medicine.

Fecci's research has focused on brain tumor immunology and immunotherapy, and T cell dysfunction in glioblastoma and other intracranial cancers. He has received the Synaptive Preuss Award from the American Association of Neurological Surgeons (AANS) and the Congress of Neurological Surgeons (CNS).

== Education ==
Fecci received his Bachelor of Science degree from Cornell University, followed by a Doctor of Medicine and Doctor of Philosophy from Duke University. He also completed a Neurosurgical residency at Massachusetts General Hospital.

== Career ==
Fecci worked at Duke University as an associate professor of Neurosurgery, Immunology, Pathology, Biomedical Engineering, and Integrative Immunobiology. At the same institution, he held the role of associate deputy director of the Preston Robert Tisch Brain Tumor Center and holds principal investigator's designation. He also co-directed the Duke Center for Brain and Spine Metastasis, and holds the appointments of professor of Neurosurgery and Pathology there. Additionally, in July 2025, he became chair of the Neurosurgery department at the University of Colorado School of Medicine.

== Research ==
In a collaborative research, Fecci conducted an immunocompetent study with an emphasis on lung adenocarcinoma and observed that TIM-3 expression significantly contributed to tumor relapse after anti-PD-1 treatment. He also demonstrated that the activated epidermal growth factor receptor (EGFR) pathway promoted immune escape by increasing the levels of PD-1 and PD-L1. Additionally, he examined the presence of STK11/LKB1 in KRas-mutated tumors, determining that it lowers PD-L1 levels, reduces T-cell infiltration, and increases T-cell exhaustion markers.

Fecci highlighted that both CD4+ T cells and Th cells are reduced in murine glioma models; however, Tregs account for a disproportionately large portion within the CD4 population. He emphasized that dexamethasone reduces T cell proliferation and increases cytotoxic T-lymphocyte-associated protein 4 (CTLA-4) on T cell surfaces. In a group study, he identified that glioblastoma induced T cell dysfunction and categorized it into exhaustion, senescence, anergy, tolerance, and ignorance.

== Awards and honors ==
- 2013 – Synaptive Preuss Award, American Association of Neurological Surgeons (AANS) and the Congress of Neurological Surgeons (CNS)
- 2015 – Sontag Distinguished Scientist Award, Sontag Foundation
- 2016 – Prince Mahidol Youth Mentor Award, Prince Mahidol Award Foundation

== Selected articles ==
- Fecci, P. E.; Mitchell, D. A.; Whitesides, J. F.; Xie, W.; Friedman, A. H.; Archer, G. E.; et al. (2006). "Increased regulatory T‑cell fraction amidst a diminished CD4 compartment explains cellular immune defects in patients with malignant glioma". Cancer Research. 66 (6): 3294–3302. doi:10.1158/0008-5472.CAN-05-3773. PMID 16540683.
- Akbay, E. A.; Koyama, S.; Carretero, J.; Altabef, A.; Tchaicha, J. H.; Christensen, C. L.; Wong, K. K.; et al. (2013). "Activation of the PD‑1 pathway contributes to immune escape in EGFR‑driven lung tumors". Cancer Discovery. 3 (12): 1355–1363. doi:10.1158/2159-8290.CD-13-0310. PMC 3864135. PMID 24078774.
- Koyama, S.; Akbay, E. A.; Li, Y. Y.; Herter‑Sprie, G. S.; Buczkowski, K. A.; Richards, W. G.; Hammerman, P. S.; et al. (2016). "Adaptive resistance to therapeutic PD‑1 blockade is associated with upregulation of alternative immune checkpoints". Nature Communications. 7 10501. Bibcode:2016NatCo...710501K. doi:10.1038/ncomms10501. PMC 4757784. PMID 26883990.
- Koyama, S.; Akbay, E. A.; Li, Y. Y.; Aref, A. R.; Skoulidis, F.; Herter‑Sprie, G. S.; Wong, K. K.; et al. (2016). "STK11/LKB1 deficiency promotes neutrophil recruitment and proinflammatory cytokine production to suppress T‑cell activity in the lung tumor microenvironment". Cancer Research. 76 (5): 999–1008. doi:10.1158/0008-5472.CAN-15-1439. PMC 4775354. PMID 26833127.
- Sampson, J. H.; Gunn, M. D.; Fecci, P. E.; Ashley, D. M. (2020). "Brain immunology and immunotherapy in brain tumours". Nature Reviews Cancer. 20 (1): 12–25. doi:10.1038/s41568-019-0224-7. PMC 7327710. PMID 31806885.
