= Trk receptor =

InterPro Family

Identifiers
- Symbol: Trk
- InterPro: IPR020777
- Membranome: 1342
Available protein structures:
- PDB: IPR020777
- AlphaFold: IPR020777

Trk receptors are a family of tyrosine kinases that regulates synaptic strength and plasticity in the mammalian nervous system. Trk receptors affect neuronal survival and differentiation through several signaling cascades. However, the activation of these receptors also has significant effects on functional properties of neurons.

The common ligands of trk receptors are neurotrophins, a family of growth factors critical to the functioning of the nervous system. The binding of these molecules is highly specific. Each type of neurotrophin has different binding affinity toward its corresponding Trk receptor. The activation of Trk receptors by neurotrophin binding may lead to activation of signal cascades resulting in promoting survival and other functional regulation of cells.

== Origin of the name trk ==
The abbreviation trk (often pronounced 'track') stands for tropomyosin receptor kinase or tyrosine receptor kinase (and not "tyrosine kinase receptor" nor "tropomyosin-related kinase", as has been commonly mistaken).

The family of Trk receptors is named for the oncogene trk, whose identification led to the discovery of its first member, TrkA. Trk, initially identified in a colon carcinoma, is frequently (25%) activated in thyroid papillary carcinomas. The oncogene was generated by a mutation in chromosome 1 that resulted in the fusion of the first seven exons of tropomyosin to the transmembrane and cytoplasmic domains of the then-unknown TrkA receptor. Normal Trk receptors do not contain amino acid or DNA sequences related to tropomyosin.

== Types and corresponding ligands ==
The three most common types of trk receptors are trkA, trkB, and trkC. Each of these receptor types has different binding affinity to certain types of neurotrophins. The differences in the signaling initiated by these distinct types of receptors are important for generating diverse biological responses.

Neurotrophin ligands of Trk receptors are processed ligands, meaning that they are synthesized in immature forms and then transformed by protease cleavage. Immature neurotrophins are specific only to one common p75NTR receptor. However, protease cleavage generates neurotrophins that have higher affinity to their corresponding Trk receptors. These processed neurotrophins can still bind to p75NTR, but at a much lower affinity.

=== TrkA ===
TrkA is a protein encoded by the NTRK1 gene and has the highest affinity to the binding nerve growth factor (NGF) After NGF is bound to TrkA this leads to a ligand-induced dimerization causing the autophosphorylation of the tyrosine kinase segment, which in turn activates the Ras/MAPK pathway and the PI3K/Akt pathway. NGF is a neurotrophic factor, and the NGF/TrkA interaction is critical in both local and nuclear actions, regulating growth cones, motility, and expression of genes encoding the biosynthesis of enzymes for neurotransmitters. Peptidergic nociceptive sensory neurons express mostly trkA and not trkB or trkC. The TrkA receptor is associated with several diseases such as Inflammatory arthritis, keratoconus, functional dyspepsia and, in some cases, over expression has been linked to cancer development. In other cases, such as neuroblastoma Trk A acts as a promising prognostic indicator as it has the potential to induce terminal differentiation of cancer cells in a context-dependent manner.

=== TrkB ===
TrkB has the highest affinity to the binding of brain-derived neurotrophic factor (BDNF) and NT-4. BDNF is a growth factor that has important roles in the survival and function of neurons in the central nervous system. The binding of BDNF to TrkB receptor causes many intracellular cascades to be activated, which regulate neuronal development and plasticity, long-term potentiation, and apoptosis.

Although both BDNF and NT-4 have high specificity to TrkB, they are not interchangeable. In a mouse model study where BDNF expression was replaced by NT-4, the mouse with NT4 expression appeared to be smaller and exhibited decreased fertility.

Recently, studies have also indicated that TrkB receptor is associated with Alzheimer's disease and post-intracerebral hemorrhage depression.

=== TrkC ===
TrkC is ordinarily activated by binding with NT-3 and has little activation by other ligands. (TrkA and TrkB also bind NT-3, but to a lesser extent.) TrkC is mostly expressed by proprioceptive sensory neurons. The axons of these proprioceptive sensory neurons are much thicker than those of nociceptive sensory neurons, which express trkA.

== Regulation by p75NTR ==
p75NTR (p75 neurotrophin receptor) affects the binding affinity and specificity of Trk receptor activation by neurotrophins. The presence of p75NTR is especially important in increasing the binding affinity of NGF to TrkA. Although the dissociation constants of p75NTR and TrkA are remarkably similar, their kinetics are quite different. Reduction and mutation of cytoplasmic and transmembrane domains of either TrkA or p75NTR prevent the formation of high-affinity binding sites on TrkA. However, the binding of ligands in p75NTR is not required to promote high-affinity binding. Therefore, the data suggest that the presence of p75NTR affects the conformation of TrkA, preferentially the state with high-affinity binding site for NGF. Surprisingly, although the presence of p75NTR is essential to promote high-affinity binding, the NT3 binding to the receptor is not required.

Apart from affecting the affinity and specificity for Trk receptors, the P75 neurotrophin receptor (P75NTR) can also reduce ligand-induced receptor ubiquitination, and delay receptor internalization and degradation.

== Essential roles in differentiation and function ==
=== Precursor cell survival and proliferation ===
Numerous studies, both in vivo and in vitro, have shown that neurotrophins have proliferation and differentiation effects on CNS neuro-epithelial precursors, neural crest cells, or precursors of the enteric nervous system. TrkA that expresses NGF not only increase the survival of both C and A delta classes of nocireceptor neurons, but also affect the functional properties of these neurons.4 As mentioned before, BDNF improves the survival and function of neurons in CNS, particularly cholinergic neurons of the basal forebrain, as well as neurons in the hippocampus and cortex.

BDNF belongs to the neurotrophin family of growth factors and affects the survival and function of neurons in the central nervous system, particularly in brain regions susceptible to degeneration in AD. BDNF improves survival of cholinergic neurons of the basal forebrain, as well as neurons in the hippocampus and cortex.

TrkC that expresses NT3 has been shown to promote proliferation and survival of cultured neural crest cells, oligodendrocyte precursors, and differentiation of hippocampal neuron precursors.

=== Control of target innervation ===
Each of the neurotrophins mentioned above promotes neurite outgrowth. NGF/TrkA signaling regulates the advance of sympathetic neuron growth cones; even when neurons received adequate trophic (sustaining and nourishing) support, one experiment showed they did not grow into relating compartments without NGF. NGF increases the innervation of tissues that receive sympathetic or sensory innervation and induces aberrant innervation in tissues that are normally not innervated.

NGF/TrkA signaling upregulates BDNF, which is transported to both peripheral and central terminals of nocireceptive sensory neurons. In the periphery, TrkB/BDNF binding and TrkB/NT-4 binding acutely sensitizing nocireceptive pathway that require the presence of mast cells.

=== Sensory neuron function ===
Trk receptors and their ligands (neurotrophins) also affect neurons' functional properties. Both NT-3 and BDNF are important in the regulation and development of synapses formed between afferent neurons and motor neurons. Increased NT-3/trkC binding results in larger monosynaptic excitatory postsynaptic potentials (EPSPs) and reduced polysynaptic components. On the other hand, increased NT-3 binding to trkB to BDNF has the opposite effect, reducing the size of monosynaptic excitatory postsynaptic potentials (EPSPs) and increasing polysynaptic signaling.

=== Formation of ocular dominance column ===
In the development of mammalian visual system, axons from each eyes crosses through the lateral geniculate nucleus (LGN) and terminate in separate layers of striate cortex. However, axons from each LGN can only be driven by one side of the eye, but not both together. These axons that terminate in layer IV of the striate cortex result in ocular dominance columns. A study shows that The density of innervating axons in layer IV from LGN can be increased by exogenous BDNF and reduced by a scavenger of endogenous BDNF. Therefore, it raises the possibility that both of these agents are involved in some sorting mechanism that is not well comprehended yet. Previous studies with cat model has shown that monocular deprivation occurs when input to one of the mammalian eyes is absent during the critical period (critical window). However, A study demonstrated that the infusion of NT-4 (a ligand of trkB) into the visual cortex during the critical period has been shown to prevent many consequences of monocular deprivation. Surprisingly, even after losing responses during the critical period, the infusion of NT-4 has been shown to be able to restore them.

=== Synaptic strength and plasticity ===
In mammalian hippocampus, the axons of the CA3 pyramidal cells project into CA1 cells through the Schaffer collaterals. The long-term potentiation (LTP) may induce in either of these pathways, but it is specific only to the one that is stimulated with tetanus. The stimulated axon does not impact spill over to the other pathway. TrkB receptors are expressed in most of these hippocampal neurons, including dentate granule cells, CA3 and CA1 pyramidal cells, and inhibitory interneurons. LTP can be greatly reduced by BDNF mutants. In a similar study on a mouse mutant with reduced expression of trkB receptors, LTP of CA1 cells reduced significantly. TrkB loss has also been linked to interfere with the memory acquisition and consolidation in many learning paradigm.

== Role of Trk oncogenes in cancer ==
Although originally identified as an oncogenic fusion in 1982, only recently has there been a renewed interest in the Trk family as it relates to its role in human cancers because of the identification of NTRK1 (TrkA), NTRK2 (TrkB) and NTRK3 (TrkC) gene fusions and other oncogenic alterations in a number of tumor types. More specifically, differential expression of Trk receptors closely correlates to prognosis and outcome in a number of cancers, such as neuroblastoma. Trk A is seen as a good prognosis marker, as it can induce terminal differentiation of cells, while Trk B is associated with a poor prognosis, due to its correlation with MYCN amplification. As a result, Trk inhibitors have been explored as a potential treatment avenue in the field of precision medicine. Trk inhibitors are (in 2015) in clinical trials and have shown early promise in shrinking human tumors.

=== Trk inhibitors in development ===
- Entrectinib (formerly RXDX-101, trade name Rozlytrek) is a drug developed by Ignyta, Inc., which has antitumor activity. It is a selective pan-trk receptor tyrosine kinase inhibitor (TKI) targeting gene fusions in trkA, trkB, and trkC (coded by NTRK1, NTRK2, and NTRK3 genes) that is currently in phase 2 clinical testing.
- Larotrectinib (tradename Vitrakvi) Originally targeting soft tissue sarcomas, was approved in November 2018 as a tissue-agnostic inhibitor of TrkA, TrkB, and TrkC developed by Array BioPharma for solid tumors with NTRK fusion mutations.
- Eratrectinib (formerly VC004) is a drug developed by Jiangsu Vcare Pharmatech. It has been approved in June 2026 for use in treating for solid tumors in China.

Due to this development of effective TRK inhibitors, the European Society for Medical Oncology (ESMO) is recommending that testing for NTRK fusion mutations is performed in the work up for non small cell lung cancer.

== Activation pathway ==
Trk receptors dimerize in response to ligand, as do other tyrosine kinase receptors. These dimers phosphorylate each other and enhance catalytic activity of the kinase. Trk receptors affect neuronal growth and differentiation through the activation of different signaling cascades. The three known pathways are PLC, Ras/MAPK (mitogen-activated protein kinase) and the PI3K (phosphatidylinositol 3-kinase) pathways. These pathways involve the interception of nuclear and mitochondrial cell-death programs. These signaling cascades eventually led to the activation of a transcription factor, CREB (cAMP response element-binding), which in turn activate the target genes.

=== PKC pathways ===
The binding of neurotrophin will lead to the phosphorylation of phospholipase C (PLC) by trk receptor. This phosphorylation of PLC induces an enzyme to catalyze the breakdown of lipids to diacyglycerol and inositol(1,4, 5). Diacyglycerol may indirectly activate PI3 kinase or several protein kinase C (PKC) isoforms, whereas inositol(1,4, 5) promotes release of calcium from intracellular stores.

=== Ras/MAPK pathway ===
The signaling through Ras/MAPK pathway is important for the neurotrophin-induced differentiation of neuronal and neuroblastoma cells. Phosphorylation of tyrosine residues in the Trk receptors led to the activation of Ras molecules, H-Ras and K-Ras. H-ras is found in lipid rafts, embedded within the plasma membrane, while K-Ras is predominantly found in disordered region of the membrane. RAP, a vesicle bounded molecule that also takes part in the cascading, is localized in the intracellular region.

The activation of these molecules result in two alternative MAP kinase pathways. Erk 1,2 can be stimulated through the activation cascades of K-Ras, Raf1, and MEK 1,2, whereas ERK5 is stimulated through the activation cascades of B-Raf, MEK5, and Erk 5. However, whether PKC (protein kinase C) could activate MEK5 is not yet known.

=== PI3 pathway ===
PI3 pathway signaling is critical for both mediation of neurotrophin-induced survival and regulation of vesicular trafficking. The trk receptor stimulates PI3K heterodimers, which causes the activation of kinases PDK-1 and Akt. Akt in turn stimulates FRK (Forkhead family transcription factor), BAD, and GSK-3.

=== TrkA vs TrkC ===
Some studies have suggested that NGF/TrkA coupling causes preferential activation of the Ras/MAPK pathway, whereas NT3/TrkC coupling causes preferential activation of the PI3 pathway.

== See also ==
- TrkB receptor
