= C21H22FN7O =

The molecular formula C_{21}H_{22}FN_{7}O (molar mass: 407.453 g/mol) may refer to:

- Seltorexant
- Eratrectinib
