= FLOT2 =

Protein-coding gene in the species Homo sapiens

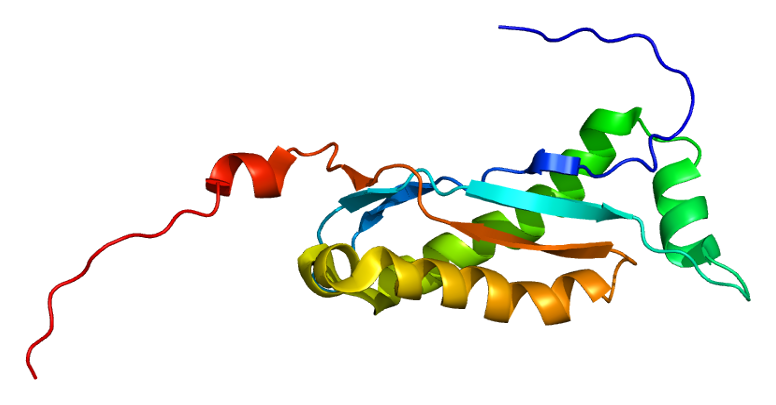

Identifiers
- Aliases: FLOT2, ECS-1, ECS1, ESA, ESA1, M17S1, flotillin 2
- External IDs: OMIM: 131560; MGI: 103309; GeneCards: FLOT2
Available structures
PDB	Ortholog search: PDBe RCSB
PDB	List of PDB id codes 1WIN

Gene location (Human)
Chr.	Chromosome 17 (human)
Band	17q11.2	Start	28,879,335 bp
Band	17q11.2	End	28,897,733 bp

Gene location (Mouse)
Chr.	Chromosome 11 (mouse)
Band	11 B5|11 46.74 cM	Start	77,928,757 bp
Band	11 B5|11 46.74 cM	End	77,951,260 bp
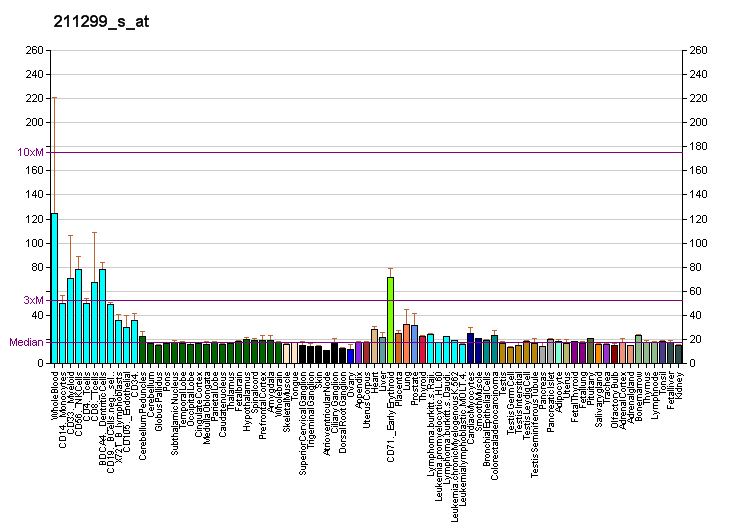

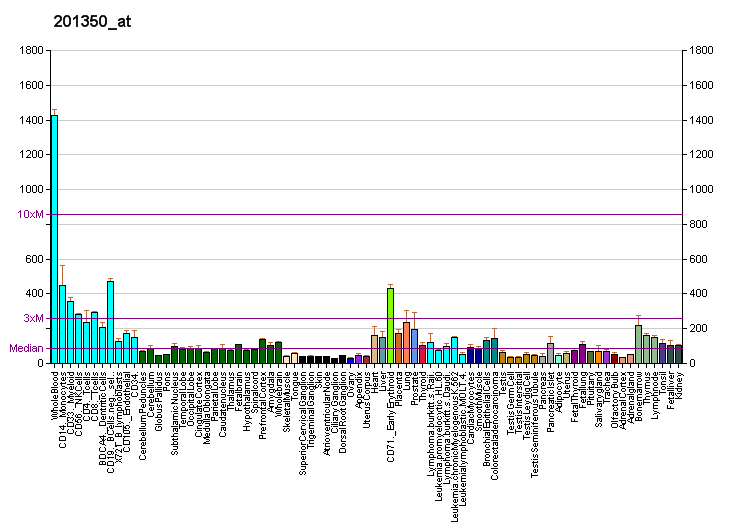
RNA expression pattern
Bgee	Human / Mouse (ortholog); Top expressed in: granulocyte; monocyte; spleen; blood; gastric mucosa; apex of heart; olfactory zone of nasal mucosa; lymph node; minor salivary glands; right lung / Top expressed in: ankle joint; external carotid artery; facial motor nucleus; internal carotid artery; tunica media of zone of aorta; granulocyte; dorsomedial hypothalamic nucleus; motor neuron; carotid body; tibiofemoral joint; More reference expression data
BioGPS	More reference expression data
Gene ontology
Molecular function	protease binding; protein binding; protein heterodimerization activity; ionotropic glutamate receptor binding
Cellular component	vesicle; endosome; membrane; cell-cell contact zone; focal adhesion; endocytic vesicle; acrosomal membrane; flotillin complex; uropod; basolateral plasma membrane; apical plasma membrane; cortical actin cytoskeleton; perinuclear region of cytoplasm; caveola; membrane raft; extracellular exosome; cytoplasmic vesicle; lamellipodium; plasma membrane; dendrite cytoplasm; synapse; glutamatergic synapse; anchored component of presynaptic active zone membrane
Biological process	positive regulation of establishment of T cell polarity; regulation of toll-like receptor 3 signaling pathway; regulation of heterotypic cell-cell adhesion; protein stabilization; negative regulation of amyloid precursor protein catabolic process; negative regulation of gene expression; protein localization to plasma membrane raft; cell adhesion; membrane raft assembly; regulation of myoblast differentiation; epidermis development; protein localization to plasma membrane; anterograde dendritic transport; regulation of postsynaptic membrane neurotransmitter receptor levels; positive regulation of NF-kappaB transcription factor activity
Sources:Amigo / QuickGO
Orthologs
Databases	NCBI: entry; OMA: entry
Species	Human	Mouse
Entrez	2319	14252
Ensembl	ENSG00000132589	ENSMUSG00000061981
UniProt	Q14254	Q60634
RefSeq (mRNA)	NM_004475; NM_001330170	NM_001040403; NM_001284227; NM_001284228; NM_008028; NM_001362625 NM_001362626; NM_001362627
RefSeq (protein)	NP_001317099; NP_004466	NP_001035493; NP_001271156; NP_001271157; NP_032054; NP_001349554 NP_001349555; NP_001349556
Location (UCSC)	Chr 17: 28.88 – 28.9 Mb	Chr 11: 77.93 – 77.95 Mb
PubMed search
- Wikidata
View/Edit Human	View/Edit Mouse

Flotillin-2 is a protein that in humans is encoded by the FLOT2 gene. Flotillin 2 (flot-2) is a highly conserved protein isolated from caveolae/lipid raft domains that tether growth factor receptors linked to signal transduction pathways. Flot-2 binds to PAR-1, a known upstream mediator of major signal transduction pathways implicated in cell growth and metastasis, and may influence tumour progression.

Caveolae are small domains on the inner cell membrane involved in vesicular trafficking and signal transduction. This gene encodes a caveolae-associated, integral membrane protein, which is thought to function in neuronal signaling.
