= MEDI7352 =

Monoclonal antibody
- Type: ?

Legal status
- Legal status: Investigational

MEDI7352 is an experimental non-opioid analgesic drug that works as a bispecific monoclonal antibody against tumour necrosis factor (TNF) and nerve growth factor (NGF); it is developed by AstraZeneca for chronic pain.
