= TRAF4 =

Protein-coding gene in the species Homo sapiens

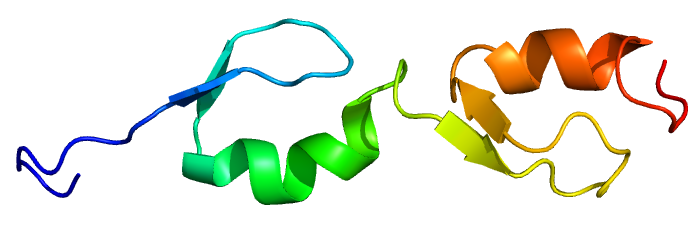

Identifiers
- Aliases: TRAF4, CART1, MLN62, RNF83, TNF receptor associated factor 4
- External IDs: OMIM: 602464; MGI: 1202880; GeneCards: TRAF4
Available structures
PDB	Ortholog search: PDBe RCSB
PDB	List of PDB id codes 2EOD, 2YUC, 3ZJB, 4K8U, 4M4E
Enzyme activity
EC #	BRENDA	ExPASy	KEGG	MetaCyc
2.3.2.27	↗	↗	↗	↗

Gene location (Human)
Chr.	Chromosome 17 (human)
Band	17q11.2	Start	28,744,011 bp
Band	17q11.2	End	28,750,956 bp

Gene location (Mouse)
Chr.	Chromosome 11 (mouse)
Band	11|11 B5	Start	78,049,325 bp
Band	11|11 B5	End	78,056,415 bp
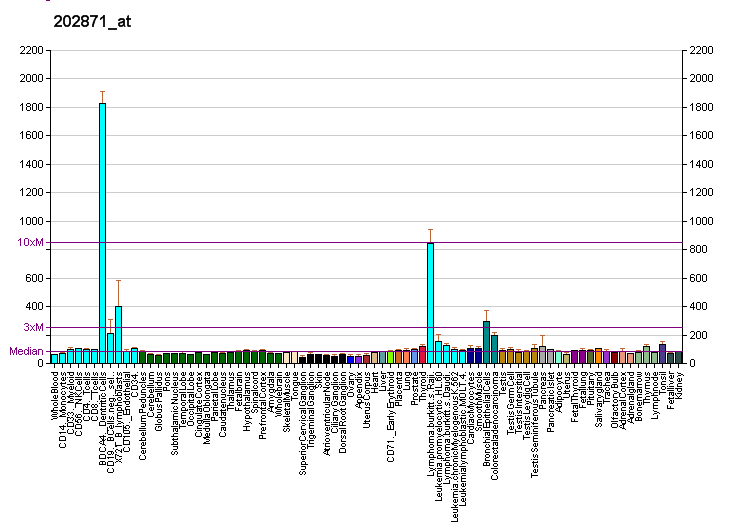

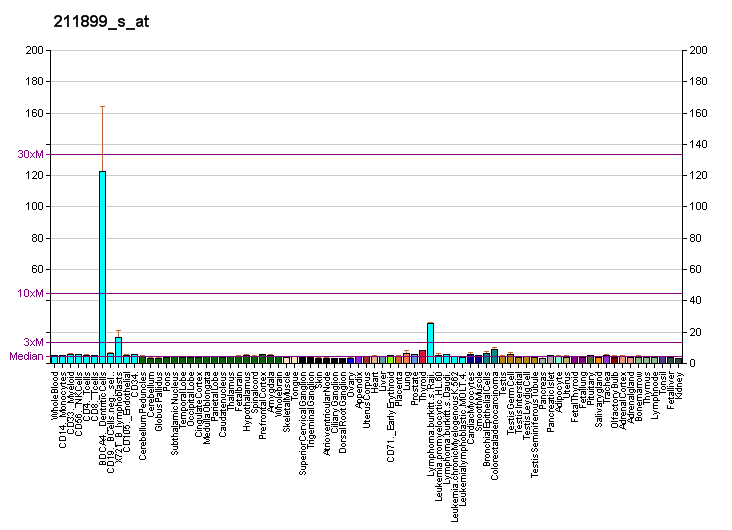
RNA expression pattern
Bgee	Human / Mouse (ortholog); Top expressed in: olfactory zone of nasal mucosa; right uterine tube; mucosa of transverse colon; right lobe of thyroid gland; minor salivary glands; left lobe of thyroid gland; right lobe of liver; ganglionic eminence; gallbladder; rectum / Top expressed in: yolk sac; right kidney; neural tube; ganglionic eminence; epiblast; ventricular zone; embryo; genital tubercle; embryo; mandibular prominence; More reference expression data
BioGPS	More reference expression data
Gene ontology
Molecular function	DNA binding; zinc ion binding; metal ion binding; protein binding; WW domain binding; thioesterase binding; tumor necrosis factor receptor binding; protein kinase binding; ubiquitin protein ligase binding; identical protein binding
Cellular component	cytoplasm; membrane; bicellular tight junction; plasma membrane; cell junction; perinuclear region of cytoplasm; cytoskeleton; nucleus; protein-containing complex; intracellular anatomical structure
Biological process	regulation of apoptotic process; activation of NF-kappaB-inducing kinase activity; positive regulation of JNK cascade; positive regulation of protein homodimerization activity; respiratory gaseous exchange by respiratory system; multicellular organism development; respiratory tube development; signal transduction; positive regulation of protein kinase activity; apoptotic process
Sources:Amigo / QuickGO
Orthologs
Databases	NCBI: entry; OMA: entry
Species	Human	Mouse
Entrez	9618	22032
Ensembl	ENSG00000076604	ENSMUSG00000017386
UniProt	Q9BUZ4	Q61382
RefSeq (mRNA)	NM_004295; NM_145751	NM_009423
RefSeq (protein)	NP_004286	NP_033449
Location (UCSC)	Chr 17: 28.74 – 28.75 Mb	Chr 11: 78.05 – 78.06 Mb
PubMed search
- Wikidata
View/Edit Human	View/Edit Mouse

TNF receptor-associated factor 4 (TRAF4) also known as RING finger protein 83 (RNF83) is a protein that in humans is encoded by the TRAF4 gene.

TRAF4 is a member of the TNF receptor associated factor (TRAF) family, a family of scaffold proteins. TRAF proteins connect IL-1R/Toll and TNF receptors with signaling factors that lead to the activation of NF-κB and mitogen-activated protein kinases. However, TRAF4 is not known to interact with TNF receptors and its cellular functions are not well understood.

== Protein interactions ==
TRAF4 has been shown to interact with neurotrophin receptor, p75 (NTR/NTSR1), and negatively regulate NTR induced cell death and NF-kappa B activation. This protein has been found to bind to p47phox, a cytosolic regulatory factor included in a multi-protein complex known as NAD(P)H oxidase. This protein thus, is thought to be involved in the oxidative activation of MAPK8/JNK. Alternatively spliced transcript variants have been observed but the full-length nature of only one has been determined.

A recent report indicates that TRAF4 binds to NOD-Like Receptors NOD1 and NOD2, and specifically inhibits activation of NF-κB by the activated NOD2-RIP2 complex
