= Philip Lazarovici =

Romanian-born Israeli neuropharmacologist

- פיליפ לזרוביץ
- Born: October 1, 1949 (age 77); Roman, Romania
- Alma mater: Hebrew University of Jerusalem (BSc, MSc, PhD)
- Known for: Research on nerve growth factor, neuroprotection, and neuronal cell signaling
- Scientific career
- Fields: Neuropharmacology, Neuroscience, Pharmacology
- Workplaces: Hebrew University of Jerusalem; Weizmann Institute of Science; National Institutes of Health

Philip Lazarovici (Hebrew: פיליפ לזרוביץ) is an Israeli neuropharmacologist and professor emeritus at the Hebrew University of Jerusalem. He held the Jacob Gitlin Chair in Physiology at the Hebrew University and was affiliated with Faculty of Medicine School of Pharmacy and Institute for Drug Research. His research has focused on nerve growth factor (NGF), neuropharmacology, neuroprotection, angiogenesis, toxins, and drug discovery.

== Education and career ==
Lazarovici received his PhD in pharmacology and toxicology from the Hebrew University of Jerusalem in 1980 and undertook postgraduate work in neurobiology at the Weizmann Institute of Science, which he completed in 1984. From 1984 to 1988, he was a visiting scientist in the Section on Growth Factors at the National Institute of Child Health and Human Development of the National Institutes of Health in Bethesda, Maryland.

Lazarovici joined the Hebrew University of Jerusalem's Faculty of Medicine, School of Pharmacy, where he became a professor and held the Jacob Gitlin Chair in Physiology.

== Research ==
Lazarovici's research has examined the pharmacological actions of nerve growth factor and the roles of its receptors, including TrkA, p75NTR and α9β1 integrin, in neuronal and non-neuronal cells. His work has addressed the involvement of NGF in neuroprotection, angiogenesis and tumor development, as well as the use of toxins and other compounds in drug discovery.

Among his early research contributions was work on interactions between growth-factor signaling pathways in PC12 cells. In a 1987 study conducted during his work at the NIH, Lazarovici and colleagues reported that treatment with NGF reduced epidermal growth factor receptor levels in PC12 cells. Later studies examined interactions between NGF and its receptors and intracellular signaling pathways involved in neuronal differentiation and neuroprotection.

His research also investigated the relationship between NGF and the vascular system. In collaboration with Cezary Marcinkiewicz and Peter I. Lelkes, Lazarovici published research on the angiogenic effects of NGF and the relationship between neurotrophic and vascular growth factors. Later work examined NGF-mediated neuroprotection in models of ischemic injury and traumatic brain injury.

His research includes the study of toxins as potential pharmacological agents, a topic featured in the book series Cellular and Molecular Mechanisms of Toxin Action, which he edited from 1997 to 2003. Lazarovici and collaborators studied snake-venom-derived compounds and their interactions with integrins. Examples are vipegitide, a peptidomimetic compound investigated as a partial antagonist of the α2β1 integrin and for its effects on platelet aggregation, and Visabron, a backbone-cyclic dual α4β1/α9β1 antagonist, therapeutically effective in the experimental autoimmune encephalomyelitis (EAE) model of multiple sclerosis.

Lazarovici was part of the Israeli group developing with TEVA Co. the drug for Parkinson's named Rasagiline (Azilect). Lazarovici has an h-index of 62.

== Patents ==
Lazarovici's patents include; "Three-dimensional scaffolds for tissue engineering made by processing complex extracts of natural extracellular matrices"; "Near-infrared fluorescent particles and uses thereof"; "Soy-derived bioactive peptides for use in compositions and methods for wound healing, tissue engineering, and regenerative medicine"; and "Viperistatin-derived peptides and uses thereof".

== Selected publications ==
- Lazarovici, Philip; Marcinkiewicz, Cezary; Lelkes, Peter I. (2006). "Cross talk between the cardiovascular and nervous systems: neurotrophic effects of vascular endothelial growth factor (VEGF) and angiogenic effects of nerve growth factor (NGF) implications in drug development". Current Pharmaceutical Design. 12 (21): 2609–2622. doi:10.2174/138161206777698738.
- Lecht, Shimon; Haroutiunian, Simon; Hoffman, Amnon; Lazarovici, Philip (2007). "Rasagiline – a novel MAO B inhibitor in Parkinson's disease therapy". Therapeutics and Clinical Risk Management. 3 (3): 467–474. PMID 18488080.
- Han, Jingjia; Lazarovici, Philip; Pomerantz, Colin; Chen, Xuesi; Wei, Yen; Lelkes, Peter I. (2011). "Co-electrospun blends of PLGA, gelatin, and elastin as potential nonthrombogenic scaffolds for vascular tissue engineering". Biomacromolecules. 12 (2): 399–408. doi:10.1021/bm101149r.
- Momic, Tatjana; Katzhendler, Jehoshua; Shai, Ela; Noy, Efrat; Senderowitz, Hanoch; Eble, Johannes A.; Marcinkiewicz, Cezary; Varon, David; Lazarovici, Philip (2015). "Vipegitide: a folded peptidomimetic partial antagonist of α2β1 integrin with antiplatelet aggregation activity". Drug Design, Development and Therapy. 9: 291–304. doi:10.2147/DDDT.S72844.
- Rubin, Limor; Stabler, Collin T.; Schumacher-Klinger, Adi; Marcinkiewicz, Cezary; Lelkes, Peter I.; Lazarovici, Philip (2021). "Neurotrophic factors and their receptors in lung development and implications in lung diseases". Cytokine & Growth Factor Reviews. 59: 84–94. doi:10.1016/j.cytogfr.2021.01.008. PMID 33589358.
- Chen, Y.; Ge, L.; Lazarovici, P.; Zheng, W. (2026). "Artemisinin attenuates Aβ1-42 aggregation via the CaMK IV/PKA-CREB-Ace-H4 cascade in neuronal cultures and 3xTg-AD models". The American Journal of Chinese Medicine. 54 (6): 1783–1805.
