= E2511 =

Clinical data
- Other names: E-2511
- Routes of administration: Oral
- Drug class: Tropomyosin receptor kinase A (TrkA) positive allosteric modulator

Pharmacokinetic data
- Elimination half-life: 3.2 hours

E2511, or E-2511, is a selective biased tropomyosin receptor kinase A (TrkA) positive allosteric modulator which is under development for the treatment of Alzheimer's disease. It is taken orally. The drug has been found to increase cholinergic signaling in preclinical research. The elimination half-life of E2511 is 3.2 hours in humans. E2511 is under development by Eisai. As of September 2024, it is in phase 1 clinical trials for Alzheimer's disease. A phase 1 clinical trial has been completed. The chemical structure of E2511 does not yet appear to have been disclosed.

== See also ==
- Tropomyosin receptor kinase A § Ligands
