= Neurotrophin-3 =

Protein found in humans

NTF3
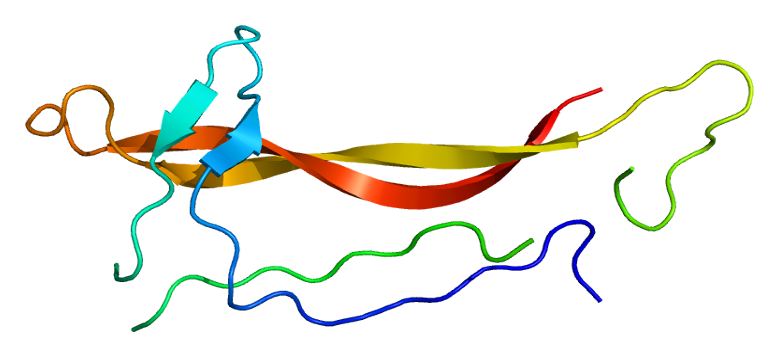

Identifiers
- Aliases: NTF3, HDNF, NGF-2, NGF2, NT-3, NT3, neurotrophin 3
- External IDs: OMIM: 162660; MGI: 97380; GeneCards: NTF3
Available structures
PDB	Ortholog search: PDBe RCSB
PDB	List of PDB id codes 1B8K, 1BND, 1NT3, 3BUK

Gene location (Human)
Chr.	Chromosome 12 (human)
Band	12p13.31	Start	5,432,108 bp
Band	12p13.31	End	5,521,536 bp

Gene location (Mouse)
Chr.	Chromosome 6 (mouse)
Band	6 F3|6 60.45 cM	Start	126,078,375 bp
Band	6 F3|6 60.45 cM	End	126,143,873 bp
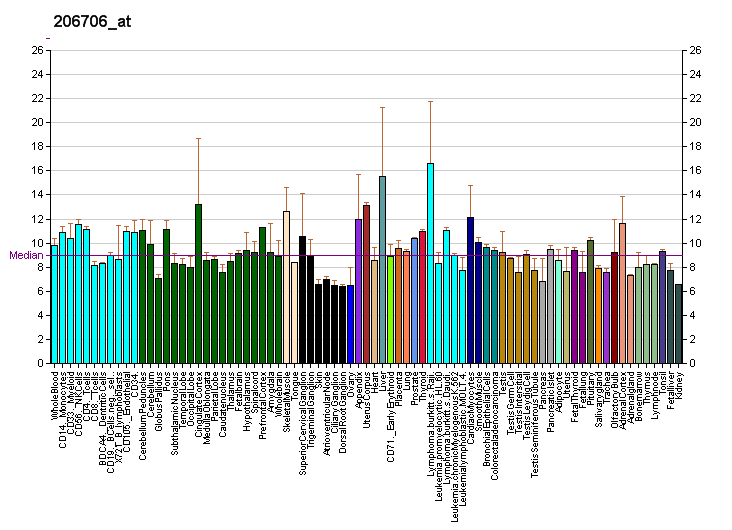
RNA expression pattern
Bgee	Human / Mouse (ortholog); Top expressed in: popliteal artery; tibial arteries; right coronary artery; ascending aorta; left coronary artery; Descending thoracic aorta; right ovary; left ovary; testicle; saphenous vein / Top expressed in: external naris; ciliary body; ascending aorta; iris; corneal stroma; conjunctival fornix; maxillary prominence; substantia nigra; pineal gland; medullary collecting duct; More reference expression data
BioGPS	More reference expression data
Gene ontology
Molecular function	neurotrophin p75 receptor binding; neurotrophin receptor binding; chemoattractant activity; growth factor activity; signaling receptor binding; protein binding
Cellular component	cytoplasmic vesicle; extracellular region; extracellular space; synaptic vesicle; axon; dendrite
Biological process	regulation of apoptotic process; negative regulation of neuron apoptotic process; regulation of neuron differentiation; activation of protein kinase B activity; neuron projection morphogenesis; activation of GTPase activity; positive regulation of receptor internalization; transmembrane receptor protein tyrosine kinase signaling pathway; positive regulation of cell migration; cell-cell signaling; positive regulation of peptidyl-serine phosphorylation; induction of positive chemotaxis; negative regulation of peptidyl-tyrosine phosphorylation; positive regulation of cell population proliferation; positive regulation of peptidyl-tyrosine phosphorylation; positive regulation of actin cytoskeleton reorganization; signal transduction; positive chemotaxis; nervous system development; regulation of signaling receptor activity; positive regulation of phospholipase C activity; positive regulation of phosphatidylinositol 3-kinase signaling; peripheral nervous system development; memory; nerve development; nerve growth factor signaling pathway; modulation of chemical synaptic transmission; positive regulation of neurotrophin TRK receptor signaling pathway
Sources:Amigo / QuickGO
Orthologs
Databases	NCBI: entry; OMA: entry
Species	Human	Mouse
Entrez	4908	18205
Ensembl	ENSG00000185652	ENSMUSG00000049107
UniProt	P20783	P20181
RefSeq (mRNA)	NM_001102654; NM_002527	NM_001164034; NM_001164035; NM_008742
RefSeq (protein)	NP_001096124; NP_002518	NP_001157506; NP_001157507; NP_032768
Location (UCSC)	Chr 12: 5.43 – 5.52 Mb	Chr 6: 126.08 – 126.14 Mb
PubMed search
- Wikidata
View/Edit Human	View/Edit Mouse

Neurotrophin-3 is a protein that in humans is encoded by the NTF3 gene.

The protein encoded by this gene, NT-3, is a neurotrophic factor in the NGF (Nerve Growth Factor) family of neurotrophins. It is a protein growth factor which has activity on certain neurons of the peripheral and central nervous system; it helps to support the survival and differentiation of existing neurons, and encourages the growth and differentiation of new neurons and synapses. NT-3 was the third neurotrophic factor to be characterized, after nerve growth factor (NGF) and BDNF (Brain Derived Neurotrophic Factor).

== Function ==
Although the vast majority of neurons in the mammalian brain are formed prenatally, parts of the adult brain retain the ability to grow new neurons from neural stem cells; a process known as neurogenesis. Neurotrophins are chemicals that help to stimulate and control neurogenesis.

NT-3 is unique in the number of neurons it can potentially stimulate, given its ability to activate two of the receptor tyrosine kinase neurotrophin receptors (TrkC and TrkB).

Mice born without the ability to make NT-3 have loss of proprioceptive and subsets of mechanoreceptive sensory neurons.

== Mechanism of action ==
NT-3 binds three receptors on the surface of cells which are capable of responding to this growth factor:

- TrkC (pronounced "Track C"), is apparently the "physiologic" receptor, in that it binds with greatest affinity to NT-3.
- However, NT-3 is capable of binding and signaling through a TrkC-related receptors called TrkB.
- Finally, NT-3 also binds a second-receptor type besides Trk receptors, called the LNGFR (for "low affinity nerve growth factor receptor).

=== High affinity receptors ===
TrkC is a receptor tyrosine kinase (meaning it mediates its actions by causing the addition of phosphate molecules on certain tyrosines in the cell, activating cellular signaling).

As mentioned above, there are other related Trk receptors, TrkA and TrkB. Also as mentioned, there are other neurotrophic factors structurally related to NT-3:

- NGF (for "Nerve Growth Factor")
- BDNF (for "Brain Derived Neurotrophic Factor")
- NT-4 (for "Neurotrophin-4")

While TrkB mediates the effects of BDNF, NT-4, and NT-3, TrkA binds and is activated by NGF, and TrkC binds and is activated only by NT-3.

=== Low affinity receptors ===
The other NT-3 receptor, the LNGFR, plays a somewhat less clear role. Some researchers have shown the LNGFR binds and serves as a "sink" for neurotrophins.

The crystal structure of NT-3 shows that NT-3 forms a central homodimer around which two glycosylated p75 LNGFR molecules bind symmetrically. The symmetrical binding takes place along the NT-3 interfaces, resulting in a 2:2 ligand-receptor cluster in the center.

Cells which express both the LNGFR and the Trk receptors might therefore have a greater activity – since they have a higher "microconcentration" of the neurotrophin.

It has also been shown, however, that the LNGFR may signal a cell to die via apoptosis – so therefore cells expressing the LNGFR in the absence of Trk receptors may die rather than live in the presence of a neurotrophin.

== See also ==
- Tropomyosin receptor kinase B § Agonists
