= MAGEH1 =

Protein-coding gene in humans

Identifiers
- Aliases: MAGEH1, APR-1, APR1, MAGEH, MAGE family member H1
- External IDs: OMIM: 300548; MGI: 1922875; GeneCards: MAGEH1

Gene location (Human)
Chr.	X chromosome (human)
Band	Xp11.21	Start	55,452,127 bp
Band	Xp11.21	End	55,453,566 bp

Gene location (Mouse)
Chr.	X chromosome (mouse)
Band	X|X F3	Start	151,819,162 bp
Band	X|X F3	End	151,820,571 bp
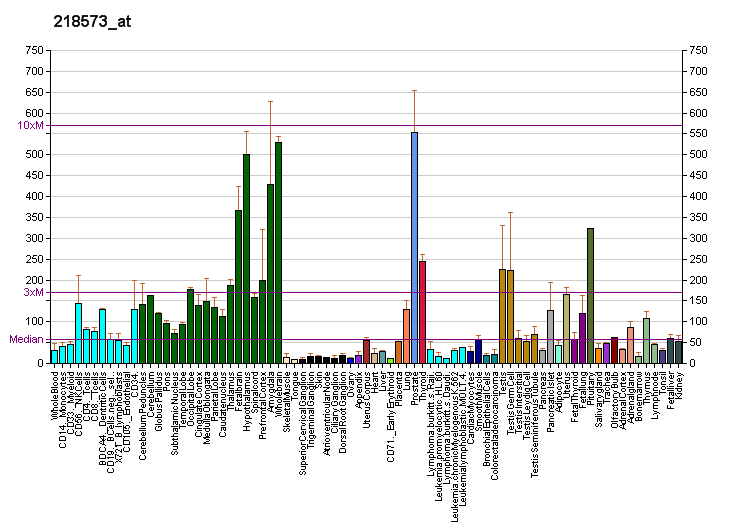
RNA expression pattern
Bgee	Human / Mouse (ortholog); Top expressed in: corpus epididymis; endothelial cell; pons; Brodmann area 9; hypothalamus; superior vestibular nucleus; cerebellar vermis; tibia; anterior pituitary; prefrontal cortex / Top expressed in: median eminence; superior cervical ganglion; arcuate nucleus; islet of Langerhans; paraventricular nucleus of hypothalamus; mammillary body; medial ganglionic eminence; lateral septal nucleus; medial vestibular nucleus; dorsomedial hypothalamic nucleus; More reference expression data
BioGPS	More reference expression data
Gene ontology
Molecular function	protein binding
Cellular component	cytoplasm
Biological process	apoptotic process
Sources:Amigo / QuickGO
Orthologs
Databases	NCBI: entry; OMA: entry
Species	Human	Mouse
Entrez	28986	75625
Ensembl	ENSG00000187601	ENSMUSG00000047238
UniProt	Q9H213	Q9NWG9
RefSeq (mRNA)	NM_014061	NM_023788
RefSeq (protein)	NP_054780	NP_076277
Location (UCSC)	Chr X: 55.45 – 55.45 Mb	Chr X: 151.82 – 151.82 Mb
PubMed search
- Wikidata
View/Edit Human	View/Edit Mouse

Melanoma-associated antigen H1 is a protein that in humans is encoded by the MAGEH1 gene.

This gene is thought to be involved in apoptosis. Multiple polyadenylation sites have been found for this gene.

== Interactions ==
MAGEH1 has been shown to interact with Low affinity nerve growth factor receptor.
