= Neurotrophin =

Family of proteins

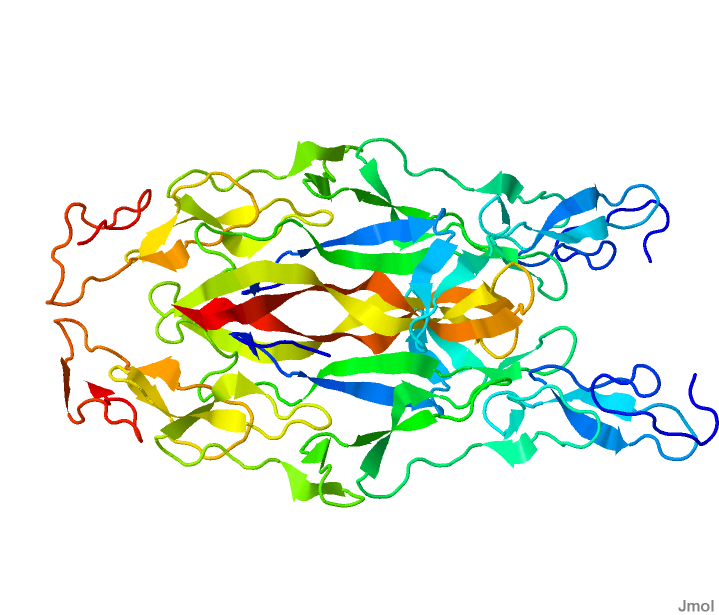

Identifiers
- Symbol: NGF
- Pfam: PF00243
- InterPro: IPR002072
- PROSITE: PDOC00221
- SCOP2: 1bet / SCOPe / SUPFAM
Available protein structures:
- PDB: IPR002072 PF00243 (ECOD; PDBsum)
- AlphaFold: IPR002072; PF00243

Neurotrophins are a family of proteins that induce the survival, development, and function of neurons.

They belong to a class of growth factors. Growth factors such as neurotrophins that promote the survival of neurons are known as neurotrophic factors. Neurotrophic factors are secreted by target tissue and act by preventing the associated neuron from initiating programmed cell death – allowing the neurons to survive. Neurotrophins also induce differentiation of progenitor cells, to form neurons.

Although the vast majority of neurons in the mammalian brain are formed prenatally, parts of the adult brain (for example, the hippocampus) retain the ability to grow new neurons from neural stem cells, a process known as neurogenesis. Neurotrophins are chemicals that help to stimulate and control neurogenesis.

== Terminology ==
According to the United States National Library of Medicine's medical subject headings, the term neurotrophin may be used as a synonym for neurotrophic factor, but the term neurotrophin is more generally reserved for four structurally related factors: nerve growth factor (NGF), brain-derived neurotrophic factor (BDNF), neurotrophin-3 (NT-3), and neurotrophin-4 (NT-4). The term neurotrophic factor generally refers to these four neurotrophins, the GDNF family of ligands, and ciliary neurotrophic factor (CNTF), among other biomolecules. Neurotrophin-6 and neurotrophin-7 also exist, but are only found in zebrafish.

== Function ==
During the development of the vertebrate nervous system, many neurons become redundant (because they have died, failed to connect to target cells, etc.) and are eliminated. At the same time, developing neurons send out axon outgrowths that contact their target cells. Such cells control their degree of innervation (the number of axon connections) by the secretion of various specific neurotrophic factors that are essential for neuron survival. One of these is nerve growth factor (NGF or beta-NGF), a vertebrate protein that stimulates division and differentiation of sympathetic and embryonic sensory neurons. NGF is mostly found outside the central nervous system (CNS), but slight traces have been detected in adult CNS tissues, although a physiological role for this is unknown. It has also been found in several snake venoms.

In the peripheral and central neurons, neurotrophins are important regulators for survival, differentiation, and maintenance of nerve cells. They are small proteins that secrete into the nervous system to help keep nerve cells alive. There are two distinct classes of glycosylated receptors that can bind to neurotrophins. These two proteins are p75 (NTR), which binds to all neurotrophins, and subtypes of Trk, which are each specific for different neurotrophins. The reported structure above is a 2.6 Å-resolution crystal structure of neurotrophin-3 (NT-3) complexed to the ectodomain of glycosylated p75 (NRT), forming a symmetrical crystal structure.

== Receptors ==
There are two classes of receptors for neurotrophins: p75 and the "Trk" family of Tyrosine kinases receptors.

== Types ==
=== Nerve growth factor ===
Nerve growth factor (NGF), the prototypical growth factor, is a protein secreted by a neuron's target cell. NGF is critical for the survival and maintenance of sympathetic and sensory neurons. NGF is released from the target cells, binds to and activates its high affinity receptor TrkA on the neuron, and is internalized into the responsive neuron. The NGF/TrkA complex is subsequently trafficked back to the neuron's cell body. This movement of NGF from axon tip to soma is thought to be involved in the long-distance signaling of neurons.

=== Brain-derived neurotrophic factor ===
Brain-derived neurotrophic factor (BDNF) is a neurotrophic factor found originally in the brain, but also found in the periphery. To be specific, it is a protein that has activity on certain neurons of the central nervous system and the peripheral nervous system; it helps to support the survival of existing neurons, and encourage the growth and differentiation of new neurons and synapses through axonal and dendritic sprouting. In the brain, it is active in the hippocampus, cortex, cerebellum, and basal forebrain – areas vital to learning, memory, and higher thinking. BDNF was the second neurotrophic factor to be characterized, after NGF and before neurotrophin-3.

BDNF is one of the most active substances to stimulate neurogenesis. Mice born without the ability to make BDNF suffer developmental defects in the brain and sensory nervous system, and usually die soon after birth, suggesting that BDNF plays an important role in normal neural development.

Despite its name, BDNF is actually found in a range of tissue and cell types, not just the brain. Expression can be seen in the retina, the CNS, motor neurons, the kidneys, and the prostate. Exercise has been shown to increase the amount of BDNF and therefore serve as a vehicle for neuroplasticity.

=== Neurotrophin-3 ===
Neurotrophin-3, or NT-3, is a neurotrophic factor, in the NGF-family of neurotrophins. It is a protein growth factor that has activity on certain neurons of the peripheral and central nervous system; it helps to support the survival and differentiation of existing neurons, and encourages the growth and differentiation of new neurons and synapses. NT-3 is the third neurotrophic factor to be characterized, after NGF and BDNF.

NT-3 is unique among the neurotrophins in the number of neurons it has potential to stimulate, given its ability to activate two of the receptor tyrosine kinase neurotrophin receptors (TrkC and TrkB). Mice born without the ability to make NT-3 have loss of proprioceptive and subsets of mechanoreceptive sensory neurons.

=== Neurotrophin-4 ===
Neurotrophin-4 (NT-4) is a neurotrophic factor that signals predominantly through the TrkB receptor tyrosine kinase. It is also known as NT4, NT5, NTF4, and NT-4/5.

=== DHEA and DHEA sulfate ===
The endogenous steroids dehydroepiandrosterone (DHEA) and its sulfate ester, DHEA sulfate (DHEA-S), have been identified as small-molecule agonists of the TrkA and p75^{NTR} with high affinity (around 5 nM), and hence as so-called "microneurotrophins". DHEA has also been found to bind to the TrkB and TrkC, though while it activated the TrkC, it was unable to activate the TrkB. It has been proposed that DHEA may have been the ancestral ligand of the Trk receptors early on in the evolution of the nervous system, eventually being superseded by the polypeptide neurotrophins.

== Role in programmed cell death ==
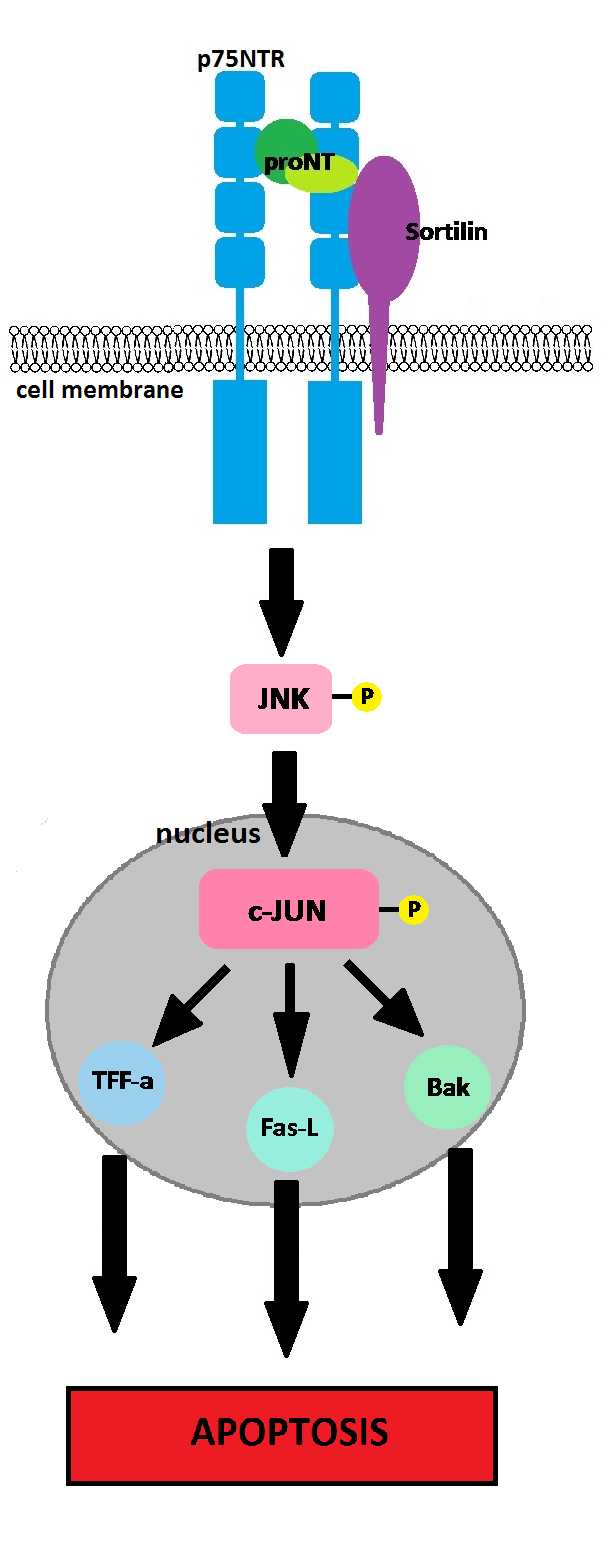
The dimerization of p75NTR when bound to proneurotrophins and sortilin leads to apoptosis via the JNK cascade.

During neuron development neurotrophins play a key role in growth, differentiation, and survival. They also play an important role in the apoptotic programmed cell death (PCD) of neurons. Neurotrophic survival signals in neurons are mediated by the high-affinity binding of neurotrophins to their respective Trk receptor. In turn, a majority of neuronal apoptotic signals are mediated by neurotrophins binding to the p75NTR. The PCD which occurs during brain development is responsible for the loss of a majority of neuroblasts and differentiating neurons. It is necessary because during development there is a massive over production of neurons which must be killed off to attain optimal function.

In the development of both the peripheral nervous system (PNS) and the central nervous system (CNS) the p75NTR-neurotrophin binding activates multiple intracellular pathways which are important in regulating apoptosis. Proneurotrophins (proNTs) are neurotrophins which are released as biologically active uncleaved pro-peptides. Unlike mature neurotrophins which bind to the p75NTR with a low affinity, proNTs preferentially bind to the p75NTR with high affinity. The p75NTR contains a death domain on its cytoplasmic tail which when cleaved activates an apoptotic pathway. The binding of a proNT (proNGF or proBDNF) to p75NTR and its sortilin co-receptor (which binds the pro-domain of proNTs) causes a p75NTR-dependent signal transduction cascade. The cleaved death domain of p75NTR activates c-Jun N-terminal kinase (JNK). The activated JNK translocates into the nucleus, where it phosphorylates and transactivates c-Jun. The transactivation of c-Jun results in the transcription of pro-apoptotic factors TFF-a, Fas-L and Bak. The importance of sortilin in p75NTR-mediated apoptosis is exhibited by the fact that the inhibition of sortilin expression in neurons expressing p75NTR suppresses proNGF-mediated apoptosis, and the prevention of proBDNF binding to p75NTR and sortilin abolished apoptotic action. Activation of p75NTR-mediated apoptosis is much more effective in the absence of Trk receptors due to the fact that activated Trk receptors suppress the JNK cascade.

The expression of TrkA or TrkC receptors in the absence of neurotrophins can lead to apoptosis, but the mechanism is poorly understood. The addition of NGF (for TrkA) or NT-3 (for TrkC) prevents this apoptosis. For this reason TrkA and TrkC are referred to as dependence receptors, because whether they induce apoptosis or survival is dependent on the presence of neurotrophins. The expression of TrkB, which is found mainly in the CNS, does not cause apoptosis. This is thought to be because it is differentially located in the cell membrane while TrkA and TrkC are co-localized with p75NTR in lipid rafts.

In the PNS (where NGF, NT-3 and NT-4 are mainly secreted) cell fate is determined by a single growth factor (i.e. neurotrophins). However, in the CNS (where BDNF is mainly secreted in the spinal cord, substantia nigra, amygdala, hypothalamus, cerebellum, hippocampus and cortex) more factors determine cell fate, including neural activity and neurotransmitter input. Neurotrophins in the CNS have also been shown to play a more important role in neural cell differentiation and function rather than survival. For these reasons, compared to neurons in the PNS, neurons of the CNS are less sensitive to the absence of a single neurotrophin or neurotrophin receptor during development; with the exception being neurons in the thalamus and substantia nigra.

Gene knockout experiments were conducted to identify the neuronal populations in both the PNS and CNS that were affected by the loss of different neurotrophins during development and the extent to which these populations were affected. These knockout experiments resulted in the loss of several neuron populations including the retina, cholinergic brainstem and the spinal cord. It was found that NGF-knockout mice had losses of a majority of their dorsal root ganglia (DRG), trigeminal ganglia and superior cervical ganglia. The viability of these mice was poor. The BDNF-knockout mice had losses of a majority of their vestibular ganglia and moderate losses of their DRG, trigeminal ganglia, nodose petrosal ganglia and cochlear ganglia. In addition they also had minor losses of their facial motoneurons located in the CNS. The viability of these mice was moderate. The NT-4-knockout mice had moderate losses of their nodose petrosal ganglia and minor losses of their DRG, trigeminal ganglia and vestibular ganglia. The NT-4-knockout mice also had minor losses of facial motoneurons. These mice were very viable. The NT-3 knockout mice had losses of a majority of their DRG, trigeminal ganglia, cochlear ganglia and superior cervical ganglia and moderate losses of nodose petrosal ganglia and vestibular ganglia. In addition the NT-3-knockout mice had moderate losses of spinal moroneurons. These mice had very poor viability. These results show that the absence of different neurotrophins result in losses of different neuron populations (mainly in the PNS). Furthermore, the absence of the neurotrophin survival signal leads to apoptosis.

== See also ==
- Neurotrophin mimetics
- Neurotrophic electrode
- Neuron
- Programmed cell death
