= Low-affinity nerve growth factor receptor =

Human protein-coding gene

NGFR
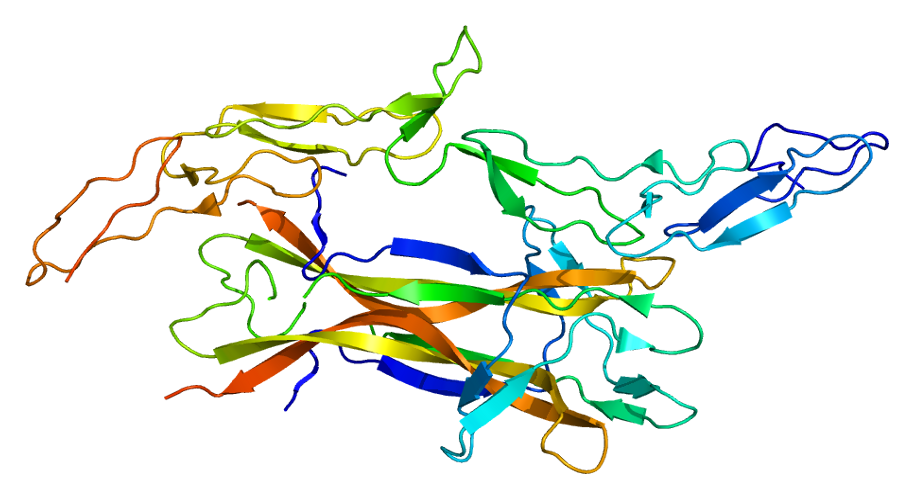

Identifiers
- Aliases: NGFR, CD271, Gp80-LTNFRSF16, p75(NTR), p75NTR, nerve growth factor receptor
- External IDs: OMIM: 162010; MGI: 97323; GeneCards: NGFR
Available structures
PDB	Ortholog search: PDBe RCSB
PDB	List of PDB id codes 3EWV, 2N80, 2N97, 2N83

Gene location (Human)
Chr.	Chromosome 17 (human)
Band	17q21.33	Start	49,495,293 bp
Band	17q21.33	End	49,515,008 bp

Gene location (Mouse)
Chr.	Chromosome 11 (mouse)
Band	11 D|11 59.01 cM	Start	95,459,644 bp
Band	11 D|11 59.01 cM	End	95,478,561 bp
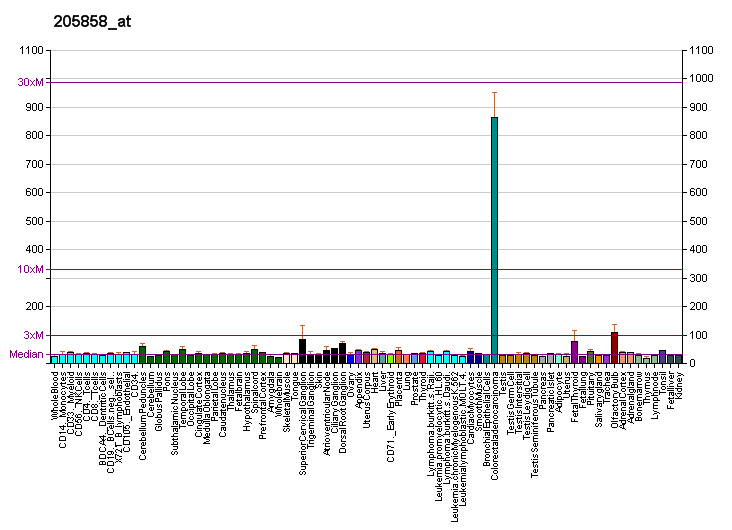
RNA expression pattern
Bgee	Human / Mouse (ortholog); Top expressed in: tibial nerve; spinal ganglia; apex of heart; sural nerve; right auricle of heart; right lobe of thyroid gland; testicle; trigeminal ganglion; left uterine tube; left lobe of thyroid gland / Top expressed in: spinal ganglia; lumbar spinal ganglion; submandibular gland; external carotid artery; cervix; Gonadal ridge; internal carotid artery; trigeminal ganglion; tunica adventitia of aorta; maxillary prominence; More reference expression data
BioGPS	More reference expression data
Gene ontology
Molecular function	signal transducer activity; transmembrane signaling receptor activity; tumor necrosis factor-activated receptor activity; ubiquitin protein ligase binding; protein binding; calmodulin binding; coreceptor activity; neurotrophin binding; nerve growth factor binding; amyloid-beta binding; death receptor activity; signaling receptor activity
Cellular component	extracellular region; nucleoplasm; integral component of membrane; cytosol; integral component of plasma membrane; neuron projection; membrane; cell surface; endosome; nucleus; plasma membrane
Biological process	rhythmic process; regulation of cysteine-type endopeptidase activity involved in apoptotic process; negative regulation of apoptotic process; neurotrophin TRK receptor signaling pathway; signal transduction; axon guidance; multicellular organism development; apoptotic process; negative regulation of axonogenesis; nervous system development; glucose homeostasis; positive regulation of axonogenesis; circadian regulation of gene expression; membrane protein intracellular domain proteolysis; cell differentiation; inflammatory response; immune response; intracellular protein transport; positive regulation of apoptotic process; negative regulation of cysteine-type endopeptidase activity involved in apoptotic process; tumor necrosis factor-mediated signaling pathway; response to lipopolysaccharide; apoptotic signaling pathway; negative regulation of neuron projection development; activation of cysteine-type endopeptidase activity involved in apoptotic process; positive regulation of protein localization to nucleus; positive regulation of pri-miRNA transcription by RNA polymerase II; negative regulation of blood vessel endothelial cell proliferation involved in sprouting angiogenesis; Rho protein signal transduction; cellular glucose homeostasis; neuron apoptotic process; cellular response to amyloid-beta
Sources:Amigo / QuickGO
Orthologs
Databases	NCBI: entry; OMA: entry
Species	Human	Mouse
Entrez	4804	18053
Ensembl	ENSG00000064300	ENSMUSG00000000120
UniProt	P08138	Q9Z0W1
RefSeq (mRNA)	NM_002507	NM_033217
RefSeq (protein)	NP_002498	NP_150086
Location (UCSC)	Chr 17: 49.5 – 49.52 Mb	Chr 11: 95.46 – 95.48 Mb
PubMed search
- Wikidata
View/Edit Human	View/Edit Mouse

The p75 neurotrophin receptor (p75NTR) was first identified in 1973 as the low-affinity nerve growth factor receptor (LNGFR) before discovery that p75NTR bound other neurotrophins equally well as nerve growth factor. p75NTR is a neurotrophic factor receptor. Neurotrophic factor receptors bind Neurotrophins including Nerve growth factor, Neurotrophin-3, Brain-derived neurotrophic factor, and Neurotrophin-4. All neurotrophins bind to p75NTR. This also includes the immature pro-neurotrophin forms. Neurotrophic factor receptors, including p75NTR, are responsible for ensuring a proper density to target ratio of developing neurons, refining broader maps in development into precise connections. p75NTR is involved in pathways that promote neuronal survival and neuronal death.

== Receptor family ==
p75NTR is a member of the tumor necrosis factor receptor superfamily. p75NTR/LNGFR was the first member of this large family of receptors to be characterized, that now contains about 25 receptors, including tumor necrosis factor 1 (TNFR1) and TNFR2, Fas, RANK, and CD40. All members of the TNFR superfamily contain structurally related cysteine-rich modules in their ECDs. p75NTR is an unusual member of this family due to its propensity to dimerize rather than trimerize, because of its ability to act as a tyrosine kinase co-receptor, and because the neurotrophins are structurally unrelated to the ligands, which typically bind TNFR family members. Indeed, with the exception of p75NTR, essentially all members of the TNFR family preferentially bind structurally related trimeric Type II transmembrane ligands, members of the TNF ligand superfamily.

== Structure ==
p75NTR is a type I transmembrane protein, with a molecular weight of 75 kDa, determined by glycosylation through both N- and O-linkages in the extracellular domain. It consists of an extracellular domain, a transmembrane domain and an intracellular domain. The extracellular domain consists of a stalk domain connecting the transmembrane domain and four cysteine-rich repeat domains, CRD1, CRD2, CRD3, and CRD4; which are negatively charged, a property that facilitates Neurotrophin binding. The intracellular part is a global-like domain, known as a death domain, which consists of two sets of perpendicular helixes arranged in sets of three. It connects the transmembrane domain through a flexible linker region N-terminal domain. It is important to say that, in contrast to the type I death domain found in other TNFR proteins, the type II intracellular death domain of p75NTR does not self-associate. This was an early indication that p75NTR does not signal death through the same mechanism as the TNFR death domains, although the ability of the p75NTR death domain to activate other second messengers is conserved.

The p75ECD-binding interface to NT-3 can be divided into three main contact sites, two in the case of NGF, that are stabilized by hydrophobic interactions, salt bridges, and hydrogen bonds. The junction regions between CDR1 and CDR2 form the site 1 that contains five hydrogen bonds and one salt bridge. Site 2 is formed by equal contributions from CDR3 and CRD4 and involves two salt bridges and two hydrogen bonds. Site 3, in the CRD4, includes only one salt bridge.

== Function ==
=== Interactions with neurotrophins ===
Neurotrophins that interact with p75NTR include NGF, NT-3, BDNF, and NT-4/5. Neurotrophins activating p75NTR may initiate apoptosis (for example, via c-Jun N-terminal kinases signaling, and subsequent p53, Jax-like proteins and caspase activation). This effect can be counteracted by anti-apoptotic signaling by TrkA. Neurotrophin binding to p75NTR, in addition to apoptotic signaling, can also promote neuronal survival (for example, via NF-kB activation). There are multiple targets of Akt that could play a role in mediating p75NTR-dependent survival, but one of the more intriguing possibilities is that Ant-induced phosphorylation of IkB kinase 1 (IKK1) plays a role in the induction of NF-kB.

=== Interactions with proneurotrophins ===
Proforms of NGF and BDNF (proNGF and proBDNF) are precursors to NGF and BDNF. proNGF and proBDNF interact with p75NTR and cause p75NTR-mediated apoptosis without activating TrkA-mediated survival mechanisms. Cleavage of proforms into mature Neurotrophins allows the mature NGF and BDNF to activate TrkA-mediated survival mechanisms.

=== Sensory development ===
Recent research has suggested a number of roles for the LNGFR, including in development of the eyes and sensory neurons, and in repair of muscle and nerve damage in adults. Two distinct subpopulations of Olfactory ensheathing glia have been identified with high or low cell surface expression of low-affinity nerve growth factor receptor (p75).

== Interactions with other receptors ==
=== Sortilin ===
Sortilin is required for many apoptosis-promoting p75NTR reactions, functioning as a co-receptor for the binding of neurotrophins such as BDNF. pro-neurotrophins (such as proBDNF) bind especially well to p75NTR when sortilin is present.

=== Crosstalk with Trk receptors ===
When p75NTR initiates apoptosis, NGF binding to Tropomyosin receptor kinase A (TrkA) can negate p75NTR apoptotic effects. p75NTR c-Jun kinase pathway activation (which causes apoptosis) is suppressed when NGF binds to TrkA. p75NTR activation of NF-kB, which promotes survival, is unaffected by NGF binding to TrkA.

=== Nogo-66 receptor (NgR1) ===
p75NTR functions in a complex with Nogo-66 receptor (NgR1) to mediate RhoA-dependent inhibition of growth of regenerating axons exposed to inhibitory proteins of CNS myelin, such as Nogo, MAG or OMgP. Without p75NTR, OMgP can activate RhoA and inhibit CNS axon regeneration. Coexpression of p75NTR and OMgP suppress RhoA activation. A complex of NgR1, p75NTR and LINGO1 can activate RhoA.

== p75NTR-mediated signaling pathways ==
=== NF-kB activation ===
NF-kB is a transcription factor that can be activated by p75NTR. Nerve growth factor (NGF) is a neurotrophin that promotes neuronal growth, and, in the absence of NGF, neurons die. Neuronal death in the absence of NGF can be prevented by NF-kB activation. Phosphorylated IκB kinase binds to and activates NF-kB before separating from NF-kB. After separation, IκB degrades and NF-kB continues to the nucleus to initiate pro-survival transcription. NF-kB also promotes neuronal survival in conjunction with NGF.

NF-kB activity is activated by p75NTR, and is not activated via Trk receptors. NF-kB activity does not effect Brain-derived neurotrophic factor promotion of neuronal survival.

=== RhoGDI and RhoA ===
p75NTR serves as a regulator for actin assembly. Ras homolog family member A (RhoA) causes the actin cytoskeleton to become rigid which limits growth cone mobility and inhibits neuronal elongation in the developing nervous system. p75NTR without a ligand bound activates RhoA and limits actin assembly, but neurotrophin binding to p75NTR can inactivate RhoA and promote actin assembly. p75NTR associates with the Rho GDP dissociation inhibitor (RhoGDI), and RhoGDI associates with RhoA. Interactions with Nogo can strengthen the association between p75NTR and RhoGDI. Neurotrophin binding to p75NTR inhibits the association of RhoGDI and p75NTR, thereby suppressing RhoA release and promoting growth cone elongation (inhibiting RhoA actin suppression).

=== JNK signaling pathway ===
Neurotrophin binding to p75NTR activates the c-Jun N-terminal kinases (JNK) signaling pathway causing apoptosis of developing neurons. JNK, through a series of intermediates, activates p53 and p53 activates Bax which initiates apoptosis. TrkA can prevent p75NTR-mediated JNK pathway apoptosis.

==== JNK-Bim-EL signaling pathway ====
JNK can directly phosphorylate Bim-EL, a splicing isoform of Bcl-2 interacting mediator of cell death (Bim), which activates Bim-EL apoptotic activity. JNK activation is required for apoptosis but c-jun, a protein in the JNK signaling pathway, is not always required.

=== Caspase-dependent signaling ===
LNGFR also activates a caspase-dependent signaling pathway that promotes developmental axon pruning, and axon degeneration in neurodegenerative disease.

In the apoptosis pathway, members of the TNF receptor superfamily assemble a death-inducing signaling complex (DISC) in which TRADD or FADD bind directly to the receptor's death domain, thereby allowing aggregation and activation of Caspase 8 and subsequent activation of the Caspase cascade. However, Caspase 8 induction does not appear to be involved in p75NTR-mediated apoptosis, but Caspase 9 is activated during p75NTR-mediated killing.

== Role in disease ==
=== Huntington's disease ===
Huntington's disease is characterized by cognitive impairments. There is increased expression of p75NTR in the hippocampus of Huntington's disease patients (including mice models and humans). Over expression of p75NTR in mice causes cognitive impairments similar to Huntington's disease. p75NTR is linked to reduced numbers of dendritic spines in the hippocampus, likely through p75NTR interactions with Transforming protein RhoA. Modulating p75NTR function could be a future direction in treating Huntington's disease.

=== Amyotrophic lateral sclerosis ===
Amyotrophic lateral sclerosis ALS is a neurodegenerative disease characterized by progressive muscular paralysis reflecting degeneration of motor neurons in the primary motor cortex, corticospinal tracts, brainstem and spinal cord. One study using the superoxide dismutase 1 (SOD1) mutant mouse, an ALS model which develops severe neurodegeneration, the expression of p75NTR correlated with the extent of degeneration and p75NTR knockdown delayed disease progression.

=== Alzheimer's disease ===
Alzheimer's disease (AD) is the most common cause of dementia in the elderly. AD is a neurodegenerative disease characterized by the loss of cognitive functioning - thinking, remembering and reasoning- and behavioral abilities to such an extent that it interferes with a person's daily life and activities. The neuropathological hallmarks of AD include amyloid plaques and neurofibrillary tangles, which lead to neuronal death. Studies in animal models of AD have shown that p75NTR contributes to amyloid β-induced neuronal damage. In humans with AD, increases in p75NTR expression relative to TrkA have been suggested to be responsible for the loss of cholinergic neurons. Increases in proNGF in AD indicate that the Neurotrophin environment is favorable for p75NTR/sortilin signaling and supports the theory that age-related neural damage is facilitated by a shift toward proNGF-mediated signaling. A recent study found that activation of Ngfr signaling in astroglia of Alzheimer's disease mouse model enhanced neurogenesis and reduced two hallmarks of Alzheimer's disease. This study also found that NGFR signaling in humans is age-related and correlates with proliferative potential of neural progenitors.

== Role in cancer stem cells ==
p75NTR has been implicated as a marker for cancer stem cells in melanoma and other cancers. Melanoma cells transplanted into an immunodeficient mouse model were shown to require expression of CD271 in order to grow a melanoma. Gene knockdown of CD271 has also been shown to abolish neural crest stem cell properties of melanoma cells and decrease genomic stability leading to a reduced migration, tumorigenicity, proliferation and induction of apoptosis. Furthermore, increased levels of CD271 were observed in brain metastatic melanoma cells whereas resistance to the BRAF inhibitor vemurafenib supposedly selects for highly malignant brain and lung-metastasizing melanoma cells. Recently, expression of p75NTR (NGFR) was associated with progressive intracranial disease in melanoma patients

== Interactions ==
Low-affinity nerve growth factor receptor has been shown to interact with:

- FSCN1,
- MAGEH1,
- NDN,
- NGFRAP1
- NGF,
- PRKACB,
- TRAF2, and
- TRAF4.
- Nogo-66 receptor
- c-Jun N-terminal kinases
- RhoA
- Rho GDP dissociation inhibitor (RhoGDI)
- NF-kB
- Neurotrophin-3
- Brain-derived neurotrophic factor
- Neurotrophin-4
