= Growth factor receptor =

Receptor protein that binds to a growth factor protein

A growth factor receptor is a receptor that binds to a growth factor. Growth factor receptors are the first stop in cells where the signaling cascade for cell differentiation and proliferation begins. Growth factors, which are ligands that bind to the receptor are the initial step to activating the growth factor receptors and tells the cell to grow and/or divide.

These receptors may use the JAK/STAT, MAP kinase, and PI3 kinase pathways.

A majority of growth factor receptors consists of receptor tyrosine kinases (RTKs). There are 3 dominant receptor types that are exclusive to research : the epidermal growth factor receptor, the neurotrophin receptor, and the insulin receptors. All growth factor receptors are membrane bound and composed of 3 general protein domains: extracellular, transmembrane, and cytoplasmic. The extracellular domain region is where a ligand may bind, usually with very high specificity. In RTKs, the binding of a ligand to the extracellular ligand binding site leads to the autophosphorylation of tyrosine residues in the intracellular domain. These phosphorylations allow for other intracellular proteins to bind to with the phosphotyrosine-binding domain which results in a series of physiological responses within the cell.

== Medical relevance ==
Research in today's society focus on growth factor receptors in order to pinpoint cancer treatment. Epidermal growth factor receptors are involved heavily with oncogene activity. Once growth factors bind to their receptor, a signal transduction pathway occurs within the cell to ensure the cell is working. However, in cancerous cells, the pathway might never turn on or turn off. Furthermore, in certain cancers, receptors (such as RTKs) are often observed to be overexpressed, which corresponds to the uncontrolled proliferation and differentiation of cells. For this same reason, tyrosine receptors are often a target for cancer therapy.
