= Tropomyosin receptor kinase C =

Protein found in humans

NTRK3
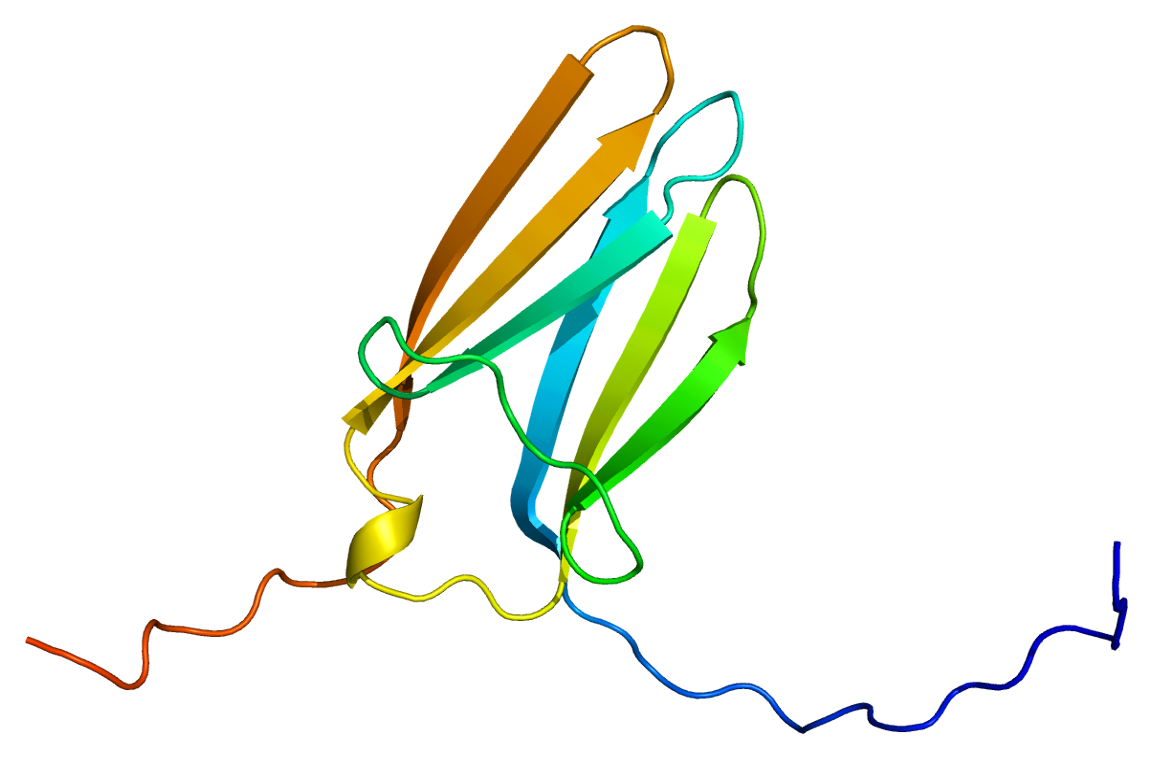

Identifiers
- Aliases: NTRK3, GP145-TrkC, TRKC, gp145(trkC), neurotrophic receptor tyrosine kinase 3
- External IDs: OMIM: 191316; MGI: 97385; GeneCards: NTRK3
Available structures
PDB	Ortholog search: PDBe RCSB
PDB	List of PDB id codes 1WWC, 3V5Q, 4YMJ
Enzyme activity
EC #	BRENDA	ExPASy	KEGG	MetaCyc
2.7.10.1	↗	↗	↗	↗

Gene location (Human)
Chr.	Chromosome 15 (human)
Band	15q25.3	Start	87,859,751 bp
Band	15q25.3	End	88,256,791 bp

Gene location (Mouse)
Chr.	Chromosome 7 (mouse)
Band	7 D2|7 44.01 cM	Start	78,175,959 bp
Band	7 D2|7 44.01 cM	End	78,738,012 bp
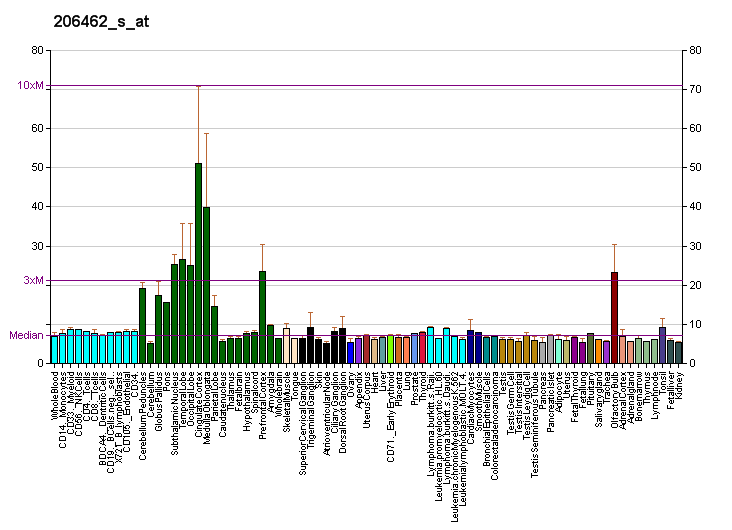

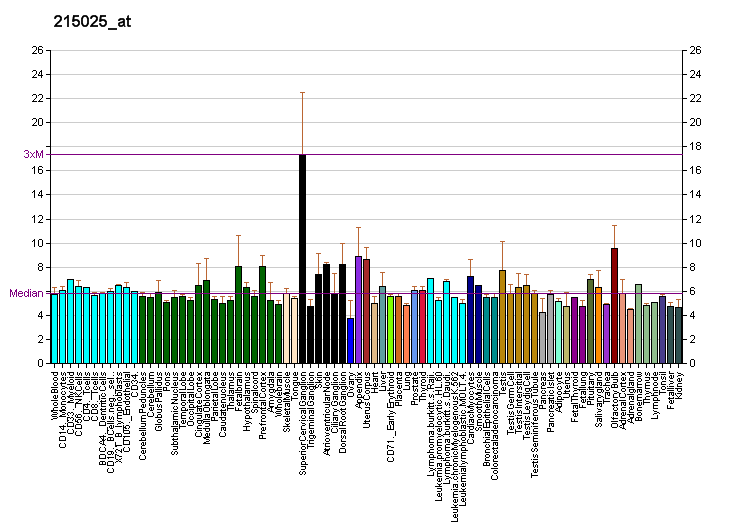

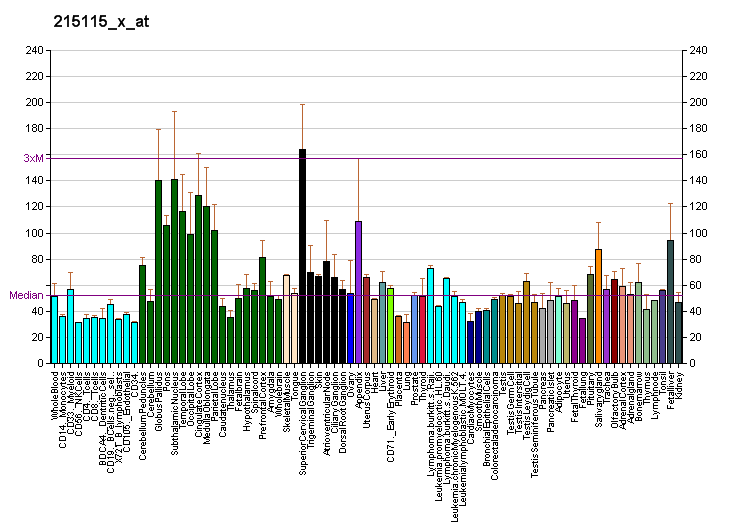
RNA expression pattern
Bgee	Human / Mouse (ortholog); Top expressed in: Brodmann area 10; Brodmann area 23; popliteal artery; tibial arteries; frontal pole; middle temporal gyrus; paraflocculus of cerebellum; right coronary artery; spinal ganglia; middle frontal gyrus / Top expressed in: ascending aorta; subiculum; cerebellar vermis; lobe of cerebellum; aortic valve; lumbar spinal ganglion; dorsomedial hypothalamic nucleus; olfactory tubercle; ventral tegmental area; paraventricular nucleus of hypothalamus; More reference expression data
BioGPS	More reference expression data
Gene ontology
Molecular function	nucleotide binding; protein tyrosine kinase activity; neurotrophin binding; protein kinase activity; transferase activity; transmembrane receptor protein tyrosine kinase activity; kinase activity; neurotrophin receptor activity; GPI-linked ephrin receptor activity; ATP binding; p53 binding; protein binding; receptor tyrosine kinase; transmembrane signaling receptor activity
Cellular component	cytoplasm; integral component of membrane; membrane; receptor complex; integral component of plasma membrane; plasma membrane; glutamatergic synapse; integral component of postsynaptic membrane; axon
Biological process	circadian rhythm; positive regulation of peptidyl-serine phosphorylation; ephrin receptor signaling pathway; response to ethanol; activation of protein kinase B activity; positive regulation of synapse assembly; multicellular organism development; positive regulation of actin cytoskeleton reorganization; positive regulation of cell migration; response to corticosterone; protein autophosphorylation; negative regulation of cell death; development of the heart; positive regulation of apoptotic process; peptidyl-tyrosine phosphorylation; cochlea development; nervous system development; positive regulation of gene expression; negative regulation of protein phosphorylation; activation of GTPase activity; protein phosphorylation; neurotrophin signaling pathway; cellular response to retinoic acid; neuron fate specification; positive regulation of axon extension involved in regeneration; positive regulation of cell population proliferation; modulation by virus of host transcription; lens fiber cell differentiation; mechanoreceptor differentiation; response to axon injury; positive regulation of positive chemotaxis; cell differentiation; negative regulation of astrocyte differentiation; positive regulation of protein phosphorylation; neuron migration; phosphorylation; transmembrane receptor protein tyrosine kinase signaling pathway; positive regulation of phospholipase C activity; positive regulation of phosphatidylinositol 3-kinase signaling; regulation of postsynaptic density assembly; regulation of presynapse assembly; negative regulation of signal transduction; positive regulation of neuron projection development; neuronal action potential propagation; myelination in peripheral nervous system; negative regulation of apoptotic process; positive regulation of ERK1 and ERK2 cascade; cellular response to nerve growth factor stimulus; regulation of MAPK cascade; positive regulation of MAPK cascade; positive regulation of neurotrophin TRK receptor signaling pathway
Sources:Amigo / QuickGO
Orthologs
Databases	NCBI: entry; OMA: entry
Species	Human	Mouse
Entrez	4916	18213
Ensembl	ENSG00000140538	ENSMUSG00000059146
UniProt	Q16288	Q6VNS1
RefSeq (mRNA)	NM_001007156; NM_001012338; NM_001243101; NM_002530; NM_001320134 NM_001320135; NM_001375810; NM_001375811; NM_001375812; NM_001375813; NM_001375814	NM_008746; NM_182809
RefSeq (protein)	NP_001007157; NP_001012338; NP_001230030; NP_001307063; NP_001307064 NP_002521; NP_001362739; NP_001362740; NP_001362741; NP_001362742; NP_001362743; NP_002521.2	NP_032772; NP_877961
Location (UCSC)	Chr 15: 87.86 – 88.26 Mb	Chr 7: 78.18 – 78.74 Mb
PubMed search
- Wikidata
View/Edit Human	View/Edit Mouse

Tropomyosin receptor kinase C (TrkC), also known as NT-3 growth factor receptor, neurotrophic tyrosine kinase receptor type 3, or TrkC tyrosine kinase, is a protein that in humans is encoded by the NTRK3 gene.

TrkC is the high affinity catalytic receptor for the neurotrophin NT-3 (neurotrophin-3). As such, TrkC mediates the multiple effects of this neurotrophic factor, which includes neuronal differentiation and survival.

The TrkC receptor is part of the large family of receptor tyrosine kinases. A "tyrosine kinase" is an enzyme which is capable of adding a phosphate group to the certain tyrosines on target proteins, or "substrates". A receptor tyrosine kinase is a "tyrosine kinase" which is located at the cellular membrane, and is activated by binding of a ligand via its extracellular domain. Other example of tyrosine kinase receptors include the insulin receptor, the IGF-1 receptor, the MuSK protein receptor, the vascular endothelial growth factor (VEGF) receptor, etc. The "substrate" proteins which are phosphorylated by TrkC include PI3 kinase.

== Function ==
TrkC is the high affinity catalytic receptor for the neurotrophin-3 (also known as NTF3 or NT-3). Similar to other NTRK receptors and receptor tyrosine kinases in general, ligand binding induces receptor dimerization followed by trans-autophosphorylation on conserved tyrosine in the intracellular (cytoplasmic) domain of the receptor. These conserved tyrosine serve as docking sites for adaptor proteins that trigger downstream signaling cascades. Signaling through PLCG1, PI3K and RAAS, downstream of activated NTRK3, regulates cell survival, proliferation and motility

Moreover, TrkC has been identified as a novel synaptogenic adhesion molecule responsible for excitatory synapse development.

The TrkC locus encodes at least eight isoforms including forms without the kinase domain or with kinase insertions adjacent to the major autophosphorylation site. These forms arise by alternative splicing events and are expressed in different tissues and cell types. NT-3 activation of catalytic TrkC isoform promotes both proliferation of neural crest cells and neuronal differentiation. On the other hand, the binding of NT-3 to the non-catalytic TrkC isoform induces neuronal differentiation, but nor neuronal proliferation

== Family members ==
Tropomyosin receptor kinases, also known as neurotrophic tyrosine kinase receptors (Trk) play an essential role in the biology of neurons by mediating Neurotrophin-activated signaling. There are three transmembrane receptors TrkA, TrkB and TrkC (encoded by the genes NTRK1, NTRK2 and NTRK3 respectively) make up the Trk receptor family. This family of receptors are all activated by neurotrophins, including NGF (for Nerve Growth Factor), BDNF (for Brain Derived Neurotrophic Factor), NT-4 (for Neurotrophin-4) and NT-3 (for Neurotrophin-3). While TrkA mediated the effects of NGF, TrkB is bound and activated by BDNF, NT-4 and NT-3. Further, TrkC binds and is activated by NT-3. TrkB binds BDNF and NT-4 more strongly than it binds NT-3. TrkC binds NT-3 more strongly than TrkB does.

There is one other NT-3 receptor family besides the Trks (TrkC and TrkB), called the "LNGFR" (for "low affinity nerve growth factor receptor"). As opposed to TrkC, the LNGFR plays a somewhat less clear role in NT-3 biology. Some researchers have shown the LNGFR binds and serves as a "sink" for neurotrophins. Cells which express both the LNGFR and the Trk receptors might therefore have a greater activity—since they have a higher "microconcentration" of the neurotrophin. It has also been shown, however, that the LNGFR may signal a cell to die via apoptosis—so therefore cells expressing the LNGFR in the absence of Trk receptors may die rather than live in the presence of a neurotrophin.

It has been demonstrated that NTRK3 is a dependence receptor, meaning that it can be capable of inducing proliferation when it binds to its ligand NT-3, however, the absence of the NT-3 will result in the induction of apoptosis by NTRK3.

== Role in disease ==
With the past of the years, lot of studies have shown that the lack or deregulation of TrkC or the complex TrkC:NT-3 can be associated with different diseases.

One study have demonstrated that mice defective for either NT-3 or TrkC display severe sensory defects. These mice have normal nociception, but they are defective in proprioception, the sensory activity responsible for localizing the limbs in space.

The reduction of TrkC expression has been observed in neurodegenerative diseases, including Alzheimer's (AD), Parkinson's (PD), and Huntington's diseases (HD). The role of NT-3 was also therapeutically studied in models of amyotrophic lateral sclerosis (ALS) with loss of spinal cord motor neurons that express TrkC

Moreover, it has been shown that TrkC plays a role in cancer. The expression and function of Trk subtypes are dependent on the tumor type. For example, in neuroblastoma, TrkC expression correlates with a good prognosis, but in breast, prostate and pancreatic cancers, the expression of the same TrkC subtype is associated with cancer progression and metastasis.

== Role in cancer ==
Although originally identified as an oncogenic fusion in 1982, only recently has there been a renewed interest in the Trk family as it relates to its role in human cancers because of the identification of NTRK1 (TrkA), NTRK2 (TrkB) and NTRK3 (TrkC) gene fusions and other oncogenic alterations in a number of tumor types. A number of Trk inhibitors are (in 2015) in clinical trials and have shown early promise in shrinking human tumors. Family of neurotrophin receptors including NTRK3 have been shown to induce a variety of pleiotorpic response in malignant cells, including enhanced tumor cell invasiveness and chemotoxis. Increased NTRK3 expression has been demonstrated in neuroblastoma, in medulloblastoma, and in neuroectodermal brain tumors.

=== NTRK3 methylation ===
The promoter region of NTRK3 contains a dense CpG island located relatively adjacent to the transcription start site (TSS). Using HumanMethylation450 arrays, quantitative methylation-specific PCR (qMSP), and Methylight assays, it has been indicated that NTRK3 is methylated in all CRC cell lines and non of the normal epithelium samples. In light of its preferential methylation in CRCs and because of its role as a neurotrophin receptor, it has been suggested to have a functional role in colorectal cancer formation. It has also been suggested that methylation status of NTRK3 promoter is capable of discriminating CRC tumor samples from normal adjacent tumor-free tissue. Hence it can be considered as a biomarker for molecular detection of CRC, specially in combination with other markers like SEPT9. NTRK3 has also been indicated as one of the genes in the panel of nine CpG methylation probes located at promoter or exon 1 region of eight genes (including DDIT3, FES, FLT3, SEPT5, SEPT9, SOX1, SOX17, and NTRK3) for prognostic prediction in ESCC (esophageal squamous cell carcinoma) patients.

=== TrkC (NTRK3 gene) inhibitors in development ===
Entrectinib (formerly RXDX-101) is an investigational drug developed by Ignyta, Inc., which has potential antitumor activity. It is an oral pan-TRK, ALK and ROS1 inhibitor that has demonstrated its anti tumor activity in murine, human tumor cell lines, and patient-derived xenograft tumor models. In vitro, entrectinib inhibits the Trk family members TrkA, TrkB and TrkC at low nano molar concentrations. It is highly bound to plasma proteins (99.5%), and can readily diffuse across the blood-brain barrier (BBB).

Entrectinib has been approved by the FDA on August 15, 2019, for the treatment of adult and pediatric patients 12 years of age and older with solid tumors that have a neurotrophic tyrosine kinase receptor gene fusion

== Interactions ==
TrkC has been shown to interact with:

- SH2B2
- SQSTM1
- KIDINS220
- PTPRS
- MAPK8IP3/JIP3
- Neurotrophin-3
- TβRII
- DOK5
- BMPRII
- PLCG1

== Ligands ==
Small molecules peptidomimetics based on β-turn NT-3, with the rationale of targeting the extracellular domain of the TrkC receptor have shown to be agonist of TrkC. Posterior studies, have shown that peptidomimetics with an organic backbone, and a pharmacophore based on β-turn NT-3 structure can also function as an antagonist of TrkC.
