= Tropomyosin receptor kinase A =

Protein found in humans

NTRK1
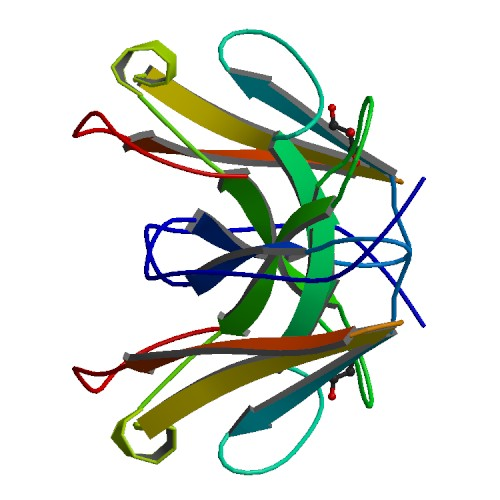

Identifiers
- Aliases: NTRK1, MTC, TRK, TRK1, TRKA, Trk-A, p140-TrkA, neurotrophic receptor tyrosine kinase 1
- External IDs: OMIM: 191315; MGI: 97383; GeneCards: NTRK1
Available structures
| PDB | Ortholog search: PDBe RCSB |
| PDB | List of PDB id codes 1HE7, 1SHC, 1WWA, 1WWW, 2IFG, 4AOJ, 4F0I, 4GT5, 4CRP, 4PMM, 4PMP, 4PMS, 4PMT, 4YNE, 4YPS |
Enzyme activity
| EC # | BRENDA | ExPASy | KEGG | MetaCyc |
|---|---|---|---|---|
| 2.7.10.1 | ↗ | ↗ | ↗ | ↗ |

Gene location (Human)
| Chr. | Chromosome 1 (human) |
| Band | 1q23.1 | Start | 156,815,640 bp |
| Band | 1q23.1 | End | 156,881,850 bp |

Gene location (Mouse)
| Chr. | Chromosome 3 (mouse) |
| Band | 3 F1|3 38.62 cM | Start | 87,685,551 bp |
| Band | 3 F1|3 38.62 cM | End | 87,702,469 bp |
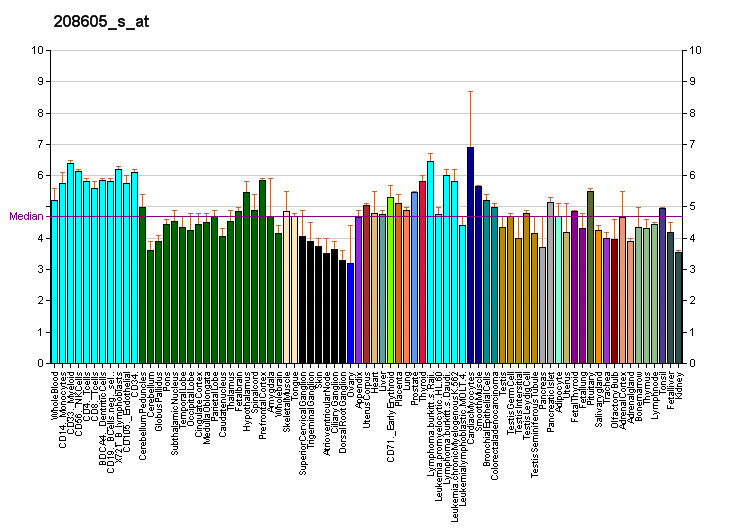
RNA expression pattern
| Bgee | Human / Mouse (ortholog); Top expressed in: spinal ganglia; apex of heart; testicle; gonad; right auricle of heart; left uterine tube; pons; muscle layer of sigmoid colon; left ventricle; body of uterus / Top expressed in: lumbar spinal ganglion; superior cervical ganglion; neural tube; trigeminal ganglion; glossopharyngeal ganglion; embryo; embryo; ganglion of vagus nerve; superior ganglion of vagus nerve; superior frontal gyrus; More reference expression data |
| BioGPS | More reference expression data |
Gene ontology
| Molecular function | neurotrophin binding; GPI-linked ephrin receptor activity; neurotrophin receptor activity; kinase activity; ATP binding; protein kinase activity; kinase binding; transferase activity; protein homodimerization activity; protein binding; nucleotide binding; nerve growth factor binding; neurotrophin p75 receptor binding; protein tyrosine kinase activity; transmembrane receptor protein tyrosine kinase activity; nerve growth factor receptor activity |
| Cellular component | cytoplasm; endosome; membrane; late endosome membrane; cell surface; integral component of membrane; late endosome; early endosome membrane; receptor complex; plasma membrane; axon; soma; early endosome; integral component of plasma membrane; dendrite; cytoplasmic vesicle; Golgi membrane; endosome membrane; protein-containing complex; recycling endosome; recycling endosome membrane |
| Biological process | negative regulation of neuron apoptotic process; positive regulation of protein phosphorylation; positive regulation of Ras protein signal transduction; positive regulation of programmed cell death; behavioral response to formalin induced pain; detection of temperature stimulus involved in sensory perception of pain; protein phosphorylation; circadian rhythm; positive regulation of ERK1 and ERK2 cascade; B cell differentiation; response to ethanol; innervation; negative regulation of cell population proliferation; response to nicotine; positive regulation of GTPase activity; positive regulation of synaptic transmission, glutamatergic; response to nutrient levels; learning or memory; protein autophosphorylation; negative regulation of neuron death; detection of mechanical stimulus involved in sensory perception of pain; cell differentiation; neurotrophin TRK receptor signaling pathway; phosphorylation; cellular response to nicotine; olfactory nerve development; response to electrical stimulus; Sertoli cell development; mechanoreceptor differentiation; nervous system development; positive regulation of angiogenesis; positive regulation of NF-kappaB transcription factor activity; response to axon injury; sensory perception of pain; response to radiation; phosphatidylinositol-mediated signaling; sympathetic nervous system development; ephrin receptor signaling pathway; cellular response to growth factor stimulus; ageing; response to hydrostatic pressure; response to activity; axon guidance; multicellular organism development; axonogenesis involved in innervation; positive regulation of neuron projection development; programmed cell death involved in cell development; positive regulation of synapse assembly; transmembrane receptor protein tyrosine kinase signaling pathway; microtubule-based movement; peptidyl-tyrosine phosphorylation; peptidyl-tyrosine autophosphorylation; nerve growth factor signaling pathway; cellular response to nerve growth factor stimulus; positive regulation of phosphatidylinositol 3-kinase signaling; negative regulation of apoptotic process; regulation of MAPK cascade; positive regulation of MAPK cascade; cellular response to amyloid-beta |
Sources:Amigo / QuickGO
Orthologs
| Databases | NCBI: entry; OMA: entry |
| Species | Human | Mouse |
| Entrez | 4914 | 18211 |
| Ensembl | ENSG00000198400 | ENSMUSG00000028072 |
| UniProt | P04629 | Q3UFB7 |
| RefSeq (mRNA) | NM_002529; NM_001007792; NM_001012331 | NM_001033124 |
| RefSeq (protein) | NP_001007793; NP_001012331; NP_002520 | NP_001028296 |
| Location (UCSC) | Chr 1: 156.82 – 156.88 Mb | Chr 3: 87.69 – 87.7 Mb |
| PubMed search |
- Wikidata
| View/Edit Human | View/Edit Mouse |

Tropomyosin receptor kinase A (TrkA), also known as high affinity nerve growth factor receptor, neurotrophic tyrosine kinase receptor type 1, or TRK1-transforming tyrosine kinase protein, is a protein that in humans is encoded by the NTRK1 gene.

This gene encodes a member of the neurotrophic tyrosine kinase receptor (NTKR) family. This kinase is a membrane-bound receptor that, upon neurotrophin binding, phosphorylates itself (autophosphorylation) and members of the MAPK pathway. The presence of this kinase leads to cell differentiation and may play a role in specifying sensory neuron subtypes. Mutations in this gene have been associated with congenital insensitivity to pain with anhidrosis, self-mutilating behaviors, intellectual disability and/or cognitive impairment and certain cancers. Alternate transcriptional splice variants of this gene have been found, but only three have been characterized to date.

== Function ==
TrkA is the high affinity catalytic receptor for the neurotrophin, nerve growth factor (NGF). As a kinase, TrkA mediates the multiple effects of NGF, which include neuronal differentiation, neural proliferation, nociceptor response, and avoidance of programmed cell death.

The binding of NGF to TrkA leads to a ligand-induced dimerization, and a proposed mechanism by which this receptor and ligand interact is that two TrkA receptors associate with a single NGF ligand. This interaction leads to a cross linking dimeric complex where parts of the ligand-binding domains on TrkA are associated with their respective ligands. TrkA has five binding domains on its extracellular portion, and the domain TrkA-d5 folds into an immunoglobulin-like domain which is critical and adequate for the binding of NGF. After being immediately bound by NGF, the NGF/TrkA complex is brought from the synapse to the cell body through endocytosis where it then activates the NGF-dependent transcriptional program. Upon activation, the tyrosine residues are phosphorylated within the cytoplasmic domain of TrkA, and these residues then recruit signaling molecules, following several pathways that lead to the differentiation and survival of neurons. Two pathways that this complex acts to promote growth is through the Ras/MAPK pathway and the PI3K/Akt pathway.

== Family members ==
The three transmembrane receptors TrkA, TrkB, and TrkC (encoded by the genes NTRK1, NTRK2, and NTRK3 respectively) make up the Trk receptor family. This family of receptors are all activated by protein nerve growth factors, or neurotrophins. Also, there are other neurotrophic factors structurally related to NGF: BDNF (for Brain-Derived Neurotrophic Factor), NT-3 (for Neurotrophin-3) and NT-4 (for Neurotrophin-4). While TrkA mediates the effects of NGF, TrkB is bound and activated by BDNF, NT-4, and NT-3. Further, TrkC binds and is activated by NT-3. In one study, the Trk gene was removed from embryonic mice stem cells which led to severe neurological disease, causing most mice to die one month after birth. Thus, Trk is the mediator of developmental and growth processes of NGF, and plays a critical role in the development of the nervous system in many organisms.

There is one other NGF receptor besides TrkA, called the "LNGFR" (for "Low-affinity nerve growth factor receptor "). As opposed to TrkA, the LNGFR plays a somewhat less clear role in NGF biology. Some researchers have shown the LNGFR binds and serves as a "sink" for neurotrophins. Cells which express both the LNGFR and the Trk receptors might therefore have a greater activity – since they have a higher "microconcentration" of the neurotrophin. It has also been shown, however, that in the absence of a co-expressed TrkA, the LNGFR may signal a cell to die via apoptosis – so therefore cells expressing the LNGFR in the absence of Trk receptors may die rather than live in the presence of a neurotrophin.

== Role in disease ==
There are several studies that highlight TrkA's role in various diseases. In one study conducted on two rat models, an inhibition of TrkA with AR786 led to a reduction in joint swelling, joint damage, and pain caused by inflammatory arthritis. Thus, blocking the binding of NGF allows for the alleviation of side effects from inherited arthritis, potentially highlighting a model to aid human inflammatory arthritis.

In one study done on patients with functional dyspepsia, scientists found a significant increase in TrkA and nerve growth factor in gastric mucosa. The increase of TrkA and nerve growth factor is linked to indigestion and gastric symptoms in patients, thus this increase may be linked with the development of functional dyspepsia.

In one study, a total absence of TrkA receptor was found in keratoconus-affected corneas, along with an increased level of repressor isoform of Sp3 transcription factor.

Gene fusions involving NTRK1 have been shown to be oncogenic, leading to the constitutive TrkA activation. In a research study by Vaishnavi A. et al., NTRK1 fusions are estimated to occur in 3.3% of lung cancer as assessed through next generation sequencing or fluorescence in situ hybridization.

While in some contexts, Trk A is oncogenic, in other contexts TrkA has the ability to induce terminal differentiation in cancer cells, halting cellular division. In some cancers, like neuroblastoma, TrkA is seen as a good prognostic marker as it is linked to spontaneous tumor regression.

== Regulation ==
The levels of distinct proteins can be regulated by the "ubiquitin/proteasome" system. In this system, a small (7–8 kd)protein called "ubiquitin" is affixed to a target protein, and is thereby targeted for destruction by a structure called the "proteasome." TrkA is targeted for proteasome-mediated destruction by an "E3 ubiquitin ligase" called NEDD4-2. This mechanism may be a distinct way to control the survival of a neuron. The extent and maybe type of TrkA ubiquitination can be regulated by the other, unrelated receptor for NGF, p75NTR.

== Interactions ==
TrkA has been shown to interact with:

- Abl gene,
- FRS2,
- Grb2,
- MATK,
- NGFB,
- PLCG1,
- RICS,
- SQSTM1,
- SH2B1,
- SH2B2, and
- SHC1.

== Ligands ==
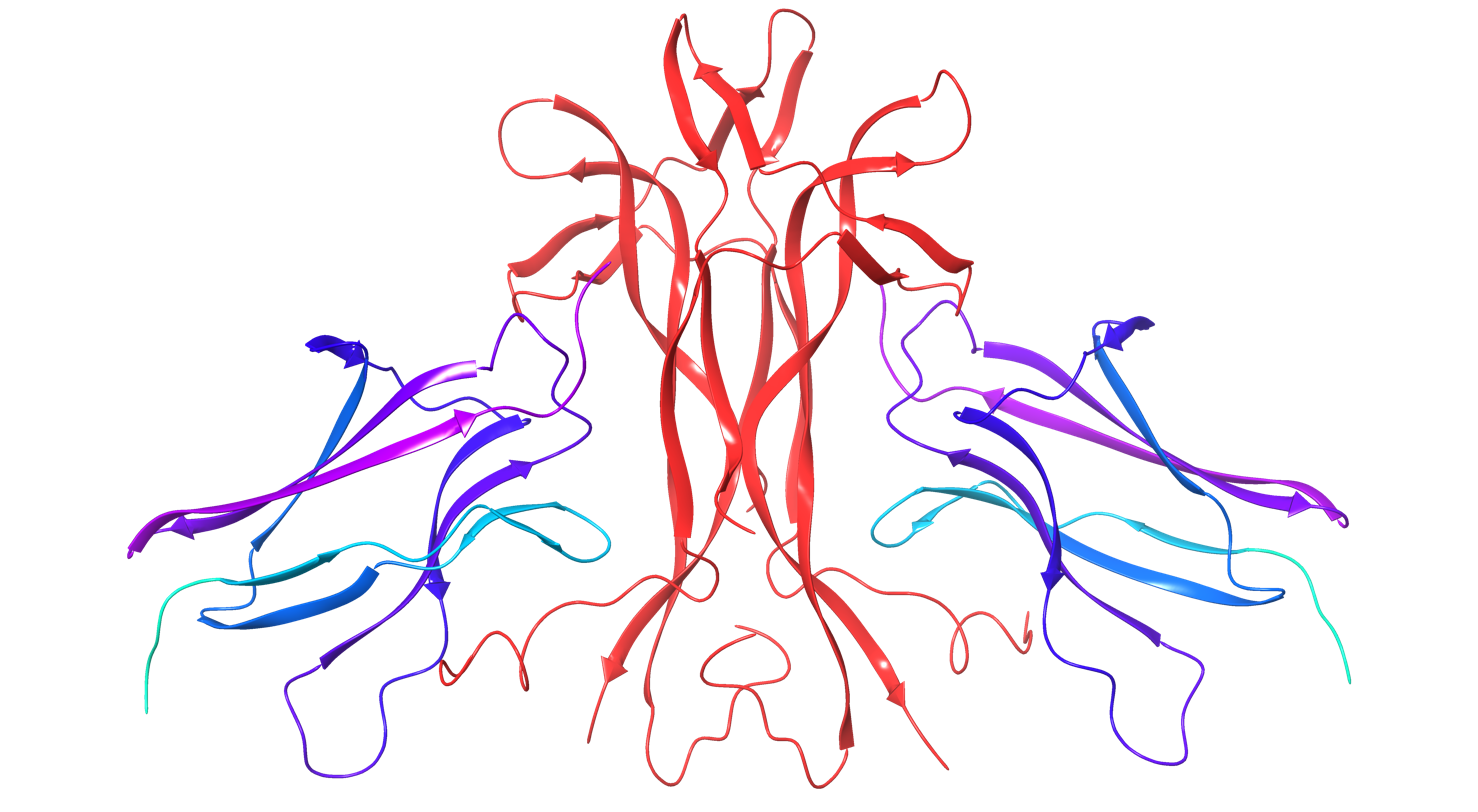
TRKA receptor domain 5 (purple) bound to NGF (red)

Small molecules such as amitriptyline and gambogic acid derivatives have been claimed to activate TrkA. Amitriptyline activates TrkA and facilitates the heterodimerization of TrkA and TrkB in the absence of NGF. Binding of amitriptyline to TrkA occurs to the Leucine Rich Region (LRR) of the extracellular domain of the receptor, which is distinct from the NGF binding site. Amitryptiline possesses neurotrophic activity both in-vitro and in-vivo (mouse model). Gambogic amide, a derivative of gambogic acid, selectively activates TrkA (but not TrkB and TrkC) both in-vitro and in-vivo by interacting with the cytoplasmic juxtamembrane domain of TrkA.

ACD856 and ponazuril (ACD855) are positive allosteric modulators of both the TrkB and TrkA. E2511 is a selective positive allosteric modulator of the TrkA only.

== Role in cancer ==
TrkA has a dual role in cancer. TrkA was originally cloned from a colon tumor; the cancer occurred via a translocation, which resulted in the activation of the TrkA kinase domain. Although originally identified as an oncogenic fusion in 1982, only recently has there been a renewed interest in the Trk family as it relates to its role in human cancers because of the identification of NTRK1 (TrkA), NTRK2 (TrkB) and NTRK3 (TrkC) gene fusions and other oncogenic alterations in a number of tumor types. The mechanism of activation of the Human Trk oncogene is suspected to involve a folding of its kinase domain, leading the receptor to remain constitutively active. In contrast, Trk A also has the potential to induce differentiation and spontaneous regression of cancer in infants.

=== Inhibitors in development ===
There are several Trk inhibitors that have been FDA approved, and have been clinically seen to counteract the effects of Trk over-expression by acting as a Trk inhibitor.

Entrectinib (formerly RXDX-101) is an investigational drug developed by Ignyta, Inc., which has potential antitumor activity. It is a selective pan-trk receptor tyrosine kinase inhibitor (TKI) targeting gene fusions in TrkA, TrkB, and TrkC (coded by NTRK1, NTRK2, and NTRK3 genes) that is currently in phase 2 clinical testing.

Larotrectinib is an inhibitor to all of the Trk receptors (TrkA, TrkB, and TrkC) and the drug is used as a treatment for tumors with Trk fusions. A clinical study analyzing the efficiency of the drug found that Larotrectinib was an effective anti tumor treatment, and worked efficiently regardless of age of the patient or tumor type; additionally, the drug did not have long lasting side effects, highlighting the beneficial use of this drug in treating Trk fusions.
