= Nerve growth factor =

Mammalian protein found in humans

NGF
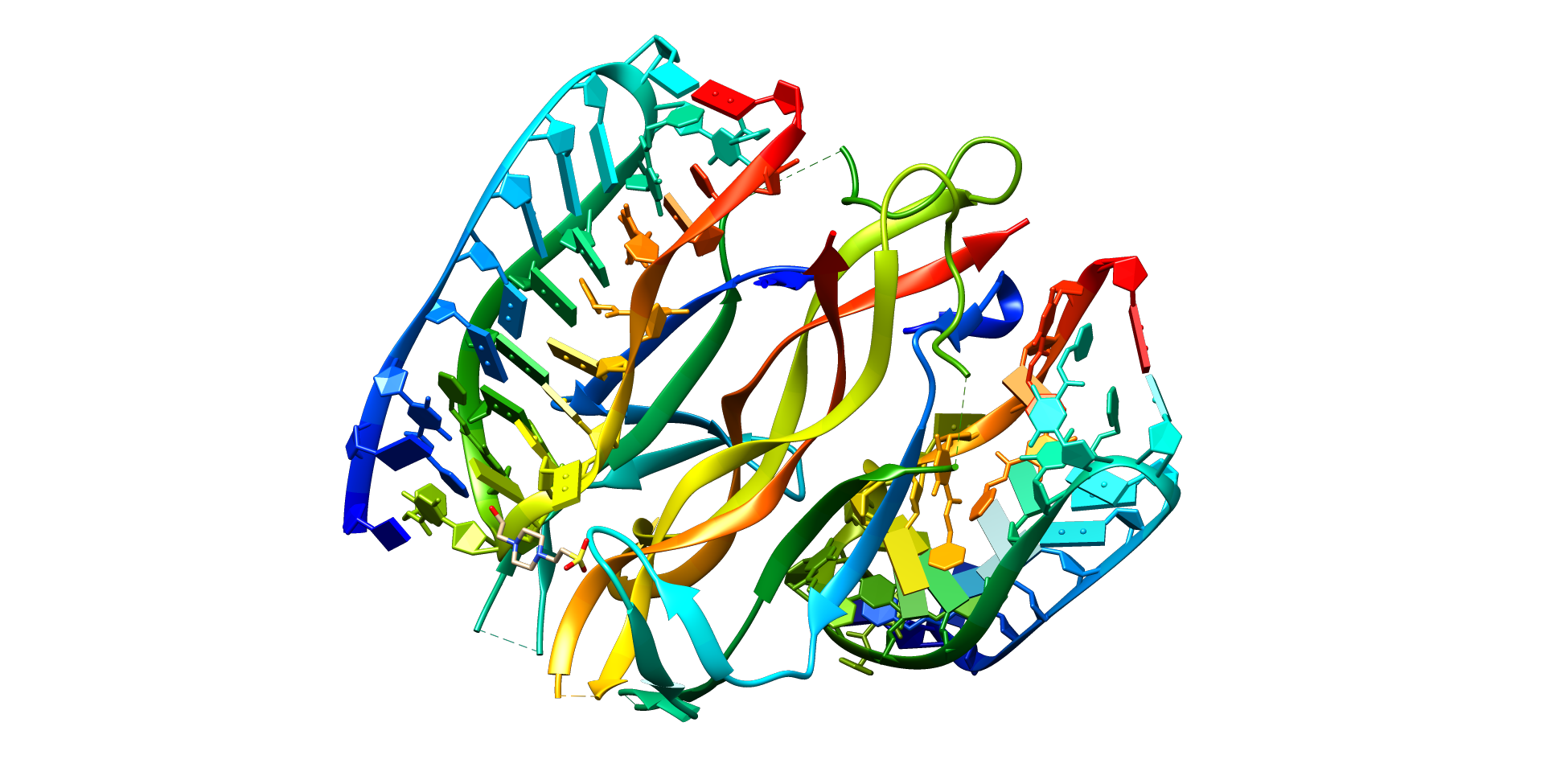

Identifiers
- Aliases: NGF, Beta-HSAN5, NGFB, nerve growth factor
- External IDs: OMIM: 162030; MGI: 97321; GeneCards: NGF
Available structures
PDB	Ortholog search: PDBe RCSB
PDB	List of PDB id codes 4ZBN, 1SG1, 1WWW, 2IFG, 4EDW, 4EDX

Gene location (Human)
Chr.	Chromosome 1 (human)
Band	1p13.2	Start	115,285,904 bp
Band	1p13.2	End	115,338,770 bp

Gene location (Mouse)
Chr.	Chromosome 3 (mouse)
Band	3 F2.2|3 45.25 cM	Start	102,377,235 bp
Band	3 F2.2|3 45.25 cM	End	102,428,329 bp
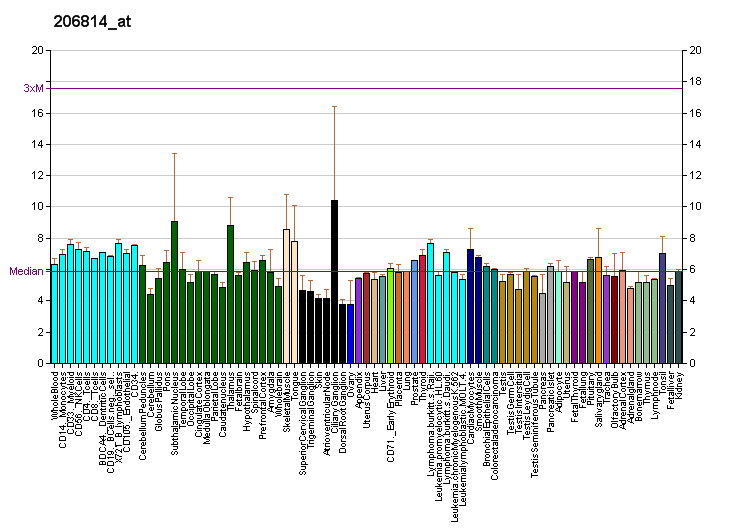
RNA expression pattern
Bgee	Human / Mouse (ortholog); Top expressed in: cartilage tissue; left uterine tube; right auricle of heart; right ovary; apex of heart; ascending aorta; left ovary; tibial arteries; left ventricle; Descending thoracic aorta / Top expressed in: submandibular gland; right ventricle; embryo; genital tubercle; endothelial cell of lymphatic vessel; dentate gyrus of hippocampal formation granule cell; embryo; skin of lower limb; right kidney; middle ear; More reference expression data
BioGPS	More reference expression data
Gene ontology
Molecular function	peptidase inhibitor activity; enzyme inhibitor activity; protein binding; metalloendopeptidase inhibitor activity; nerve growth factor receptor binding; growth factor activity; signaling receptor binding
Cellular component	endosome; Golgi lumen; extracellular region; cytoplasmic vesicle; extracellular space; cytosol; synaptic vesicle; axon; dendrite
Biological process	negative regulation of neuron apoptotic process; regulation of neuron differentiation; neuron projection morphogenesis; negative regulation of peptidase activity; neurotrophin TRK receptor signaling pathway; cell-cell signaling; negative regulation of apoptotic process; regulation of cysteine-type endopeptidase activity involved in apoptotic process; positive regulation of axonogenesis; positive regulation of gene expression; positive regulation of apoptotic process; nerve growth factor processing; extrinsic apoptotic signaling pathway via death domain receptors; phosphatidylinositol-mediated signaling; negative regulation of cysteine-type endopeptidase activity involved in apoptotic process; microtubule-based movement; activation of cysteine-type endopeptidase activity involved in apoptotic process; positive regulation of Ras protein signal transduction; transmembrane receptor protein tyrosine kinase signaling pathway; peripheral nervous system development; memory; negative regulation of cell population proliferation; regulation of signaling receptor activity; nerve development; nerve growth factor signaling pathway; positive regulation of DNA binding; positive regulation of neuron differentiation; positive regulation of collateral sprouting; modulation of chemical synaptic transmission
Sources:Amigo / QuickGO
Orthologs
Databases	NCBI: entry; OMA: entry
Species	Human	Mouse
Entrez	4803	18049
Ensembl	ENSG00000134259	ENSMUSG00000027859
UniProt	P01138	P01139
RefSeq (mRNA)	NM_002506	NM_001112698; NM_013609
RefSeq (protein)	NP_002497	NP_001106168; NP_038637
Location (UCSC)	Chr 1: 115.29 – 115.34 Mb	Chr 3: 102.38 – 102.43 Mb
PubMed search
- Wikidata
View/Edit Human	View/Edit Mouse

Nerve growth factor (NGF) is a neurotrophic factor and neuropeptide primarily involved in the regulation of growth, maintenance, proliferation, and survival of certain target neurons. It is perhaps the prototypical growth factor, in that it was one of the first to be described. Since it was first isolated by Nobel laureates Rita Levi-Montalcini and Stanley Cohen in 1954, numerous biological processes involving NGF have been identified, two of them being the survival of pancreatic beta cells and the regulation of the immune system.

== Structure ==
NGF is initially in a 7S, 130-kDa complex of 3 proteins – Alpha-NGF, Beta-NGF, and Gamma-NGF (2:1:2 ratio) when expressed. This form of NGF is also referred to as proNGF (NGF precursor). The gamma subunit of this complex acts as a serine protease, and cleaves the N-terminal of the beta subunit, thereby activating the protein into functional NGF.

The term nerve growth factor usually refers to the 2.5S, 26-kDa beta subunit of the protein, the only component of the 7S NGF complex that is biologically active (i.e. acting as a signaling molecule).

== Function ==
As its name suggests, NGF is involved primarily in the growth, as well as the maintenance, proliferation, and survival of nerve cells (neurons) and is critical for the survival and maintenance of sympathetic and sensory neurons as they undergo apoptosis in its absence. However, several recent studies suggest that NGF is also involved in pathways besides those regulating the life cycle of neurons.

=== Neuronal proliferation ===
NGF can drive the expression of genes such as bcl-2 by binding to the Tropomyosin receptor kinase A, which stimulates the proliferation and survival of the target neuron.

High affinity binding between proNGF, sortilin, and p75NTR can result in either survival or programmed cell death (PCD). Study results indicate that superior cervical ganglia neurons that express both p75NTR and TrkA die when treated with proNGF, while NGF treatment of these same neurons results in survival and axonal growth. Survival and PCD mechanisms are mediated through adaptor protein binding to the death domain of the p75NTR cytoplasmic tail. Survival occurs when recruited cytoplasmic adaptor proteins facilitate signal transduction through tumor necrosis factor receptor members such as TRAF6, which results in the release of nuclear factor κB (NF-κB) transcription activator. NF-κB regulates nuclear gene transcription to promote cell survival. Alternatively, programmed cell death occurs when TRAF6 and neurotrophin receptor interacting factor (NRIF) are both recruited to activate c-Jun N-terminal kinase (JNK); which phosphorylates c-Jun. The activated transcription factor c-Jun regulates nuclear transcription via AP-1 to increase pro-apoptotic gene transcription.

=== Proliferation of pancreatic beta cells ===
There is evidence that pancreatic beta cells express both the TrkA and p75NTR receptors of NGF. It has been shown that the withdrawal of NGF induces apoptosis in pancreatic beta cells, signifying that NGF may play a critical role in the maintenance and survival of pancreatic beta cells.

=== Regulation of the immune system ===
NGF plays a critical role in the regulation of both innate and acquired immunity. In the process of inflammation, NGF is released in high concentrations by mast cells, and induces axonal outgrowth in nearby nociceptive neurons. This leads to increased pain perception in areas under inflammation. In acquired immunity, NGF is produced by the Thymus as well as CD4+ T cell clones, inducing a cascade of maturation of T cells under infection.

=== Ovulation ===
NGF is abundant in seminal plasma. Recent studies have found that it induces ovulation in some mammals e.g. "induced" ovulators, such as llamas. Surprisingly, research showed that these induced animals will also ovulate when semen from on-schedule or "spontaneous" ovulators, such as cattle is used. Its significance in humans is unknown. It was previously dubbed ovulation-inducing factor (OIF) in semen before it was identified as beta-NGF in 2012.

== Mechanism of action ==
NGF binds with at least two classes of receptors: the tropomyosin receptor kinase A (TrkA) and low-affinity NGF receptor (LNGFR/p75NTR). Both are associated with neurodegenerative disorders.

When NGF binds to the TrkA receptor, it drives the homodimerization of the receptor, which in turn causes the autophosphorylation of the tyrosine kinase segment. The tropomyosin receptor kinase A receptor has five extracellular domains, and the fifth domain is sufficient in binding NGF. Once bound, the complex undergoes endocytosis and activates the NGF transcriptional program, following two major pathways, the Ras/MAPK pathway and the PI3K/Akt pathway. The binding of NGF to TrkA also leads to the activation of PI 3-kinase, ras, and PLC signaling pathways. Alternatively, the p75NTR receptor can form a heterodimer with TrkA, which has higher affinity and specificity for NGF.

Studies suggest that NGF circulates throughout the entire body via the blood plasma, and is important for the overall maintenance of homeostasis.

=== Neuron survival ===
Binding interaction between NGF and the TrkA receptor facilitates receptor dimerization and tyrosine residue phosphorylation of the cytoplasmic tail by adjacent Trk receptors. Trk receptor phosphorylation sites operate as Shc adaptor protein docking sites, which undergo phosphorylation by the TrkA receptor Once the cytoplasmic adaptor protein (Shc) is phosphorylated by the receptor cytoplasmic tail, cell survival is initiated through several intracellular pathways.

One major pathway leads to the activation of the serine/threonine kinase, Akt. This pathway begins with the Trk receptor complex-recruitment of a second adaptor protein called growth factor-receptor bound protein-2 (Grb2) along with a docking protein called Grb2-associated Binder-1 (GAB1). Subsequently, phosphatidylinositol-3 kinase (PI3K) is activated, resulting in Akt kinase activation. Study results have shown that blocking PI3K or Akt activity results in death of sympathetic neurons in culture, regardless of NGF presence. However, if either kinase is constitutively active, neurons survive even without NGF.

A second pathway contributing to cell survival occurs through activation of the mitogen-activated protein kinase (MAPK) kinase. In this pathway, recruitment of a guanine nucleotide exchange factor by the adaptor and docking proteins leads to activation of a membrane-associated G-protein known as Ras. The guanine nucleotide exchange factor mediates Ras activation through the GDP-GTP exchange process. The active Ras protein phosphorylates several proteins, along with the serine/threonine kinase, Raf. Raf in turn activates the MAPK cascade to facilitate ribosomal s6 kinase (RSK) activation and transcriptional regulation.

Both Akt and RSK, components of the PI3K-Akt and MAPK pathways respectively, act to phosphorylate the cyclic AMP response element binding protein (CREB) transcription factor. Phosphorylated CREB translocates into the nucleus and mediates increased expression of anti-apoptotic proteins, thus promoting NGF-mediated cell survival. However, in the absence of NGF, the expression of pro-apoptotic proteins is increased when the activation of cell death-promoting transcription factors such as c-Jun are not suppressed by the aforementioned NGF-mediated cell survival pathways.

== History ==
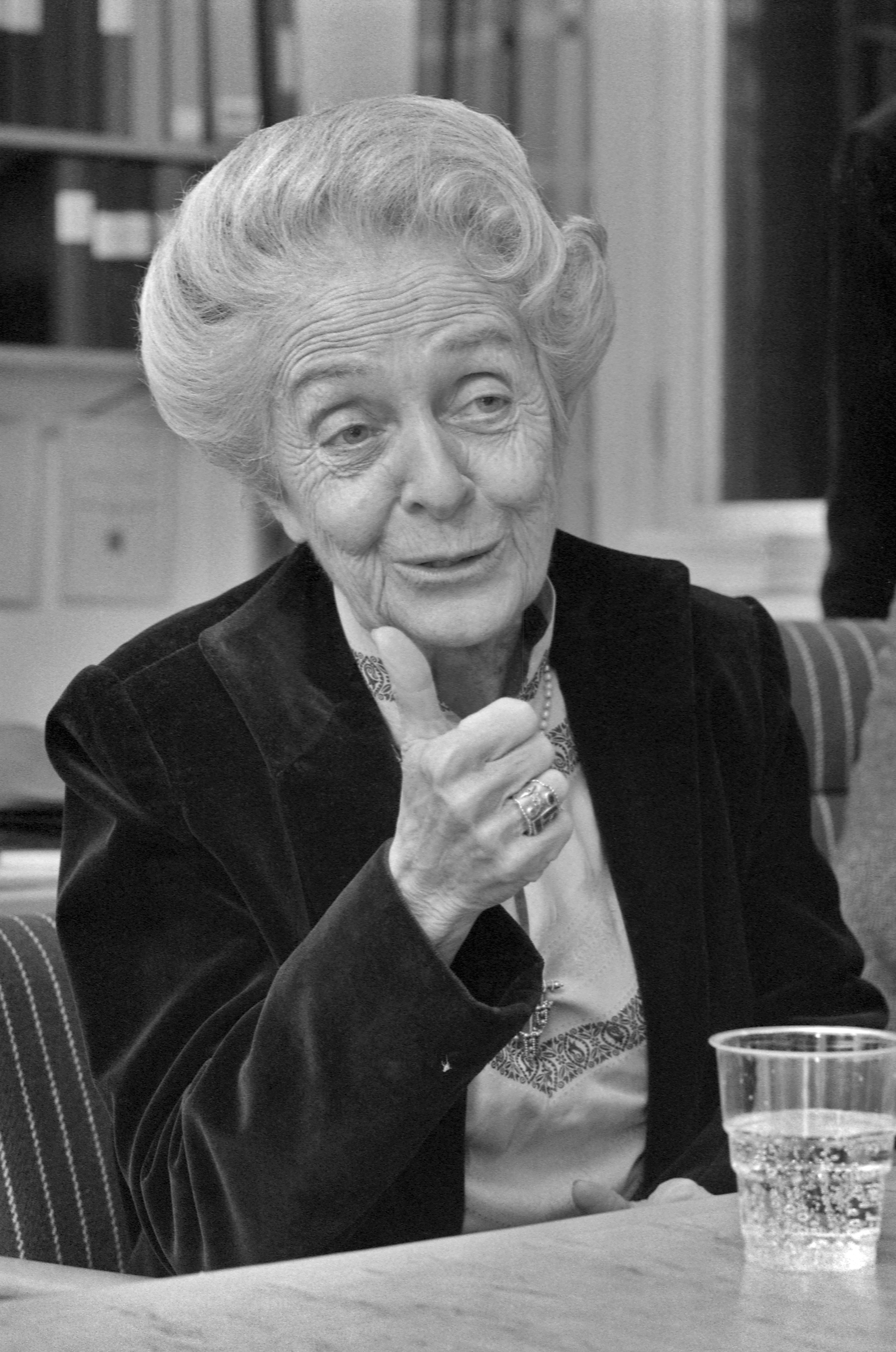
Rita Levi-Montalcini

Rita Levi-Montalcini and Stanley Cohen discovered NGF in the 1950s while faculty members at Washington University in St. Louis, for which they were awarded a Nobel Prize in Physiology or Medicine in 1986. The critical preliminary discovery was done by Levi-Montalcini and Hertha Meyer at the Carlos Chagas Filho Biophysics Institute of the Federal University of Rio de Janeiro in 1952. Their publication in 1954 became the definitive proof for the existence of the protein. Levi-Montalcini later remarked:

The tumor had given a first hint of its existence in St. Louis but it was in Rio de Janeiro that it revealed itself, and it did so in a theatrical and grand way, as if spurred by the bright atmosphere of that explosive and exhuberant manifestation of life that is the Carnival in Rio.

However, its discovery, along with the discovery of other neurotrophins, was not widely recognized until 1986, when it won the Nobel Prize in Physiology or Medicine.

Studies in 1971 determined the primary structure of NGF. This eventually led to the discovery of the NGF gene.

NGF is abundant in seminal plasma. Recent studies have found that it induces ovulation in some mammals. Nerve Growth Factors (NGF) were initially discovered due to their actions during development, but NGF are now known to be involved in the function throughout the life of the animal.

== Interactions ==
Nerve growth factor has been shown to interact with Tropomyosin receptor kinase A.

== Clinical use ==
Recombinant human nerve growth factor (rhNGF; named cenegermin) has been formulated as an eye drop (0.002%), receiving approval by the FDA in 2018 for treating neurotrophic keratitis, a disease in which corneal nerves are damaged or nonfunctional.

NGF, specifically mouse nerve growth factor, has been used as a licensed medicine in China since 2003.

== See also ==
- Protein targeting
- Nervous system
- VGF Nerve Growth Factor-inducible, a protein whose expression is induced by NGF
- Neurotrophin
- Nerve growth factor receptor
- Growth factor
- Brain-derived neurotrophic factor
