= Aging brain =

Degradation of functioning of the brain

Aging brain refers to biological and functional changes that occur in the brain as individuals advance in age. It encompasses both the normal alterations which are universally experienced and abnormalities induced by illnesses, diagnosed or not. The concept is most often used in relation to humans.

Since life extension is only pertinent if accompanied by healthspan extension, and, more importantly, by preserving brain health and cognition, finding rejuvenating approaches that act simultaneously in peripheral tissues and in brain function is a key strategy in the development of rejuvenation technology.

Aging is a major risk factor for most common neurodegenerative diseases, including mild cognitive impairment, dementias including Alzheimer's disease, cerebrovascular disease, Parkinson's disease, and Amyotrophic Lateral Sclerosis. While much research has focused on diseases of aging, there are few informative studies on the molecular biology of the aging brain in the absence of neurodegenerative disease or the neuropsychological profile of healthy older adults. However, research suggests that the aging process is associated with several structural, chemical, and functional changes in the brain as well as a host of neurocognitive changes. Recent reports in model organisms suggest that as organisms age, there are distinct changes in the expression of genes at the single neuron level. This page is an overview of the changes associated with human brain aging, including aging without concomitant diseases.

== Structural changes ==
Human brain in the sagittal plane

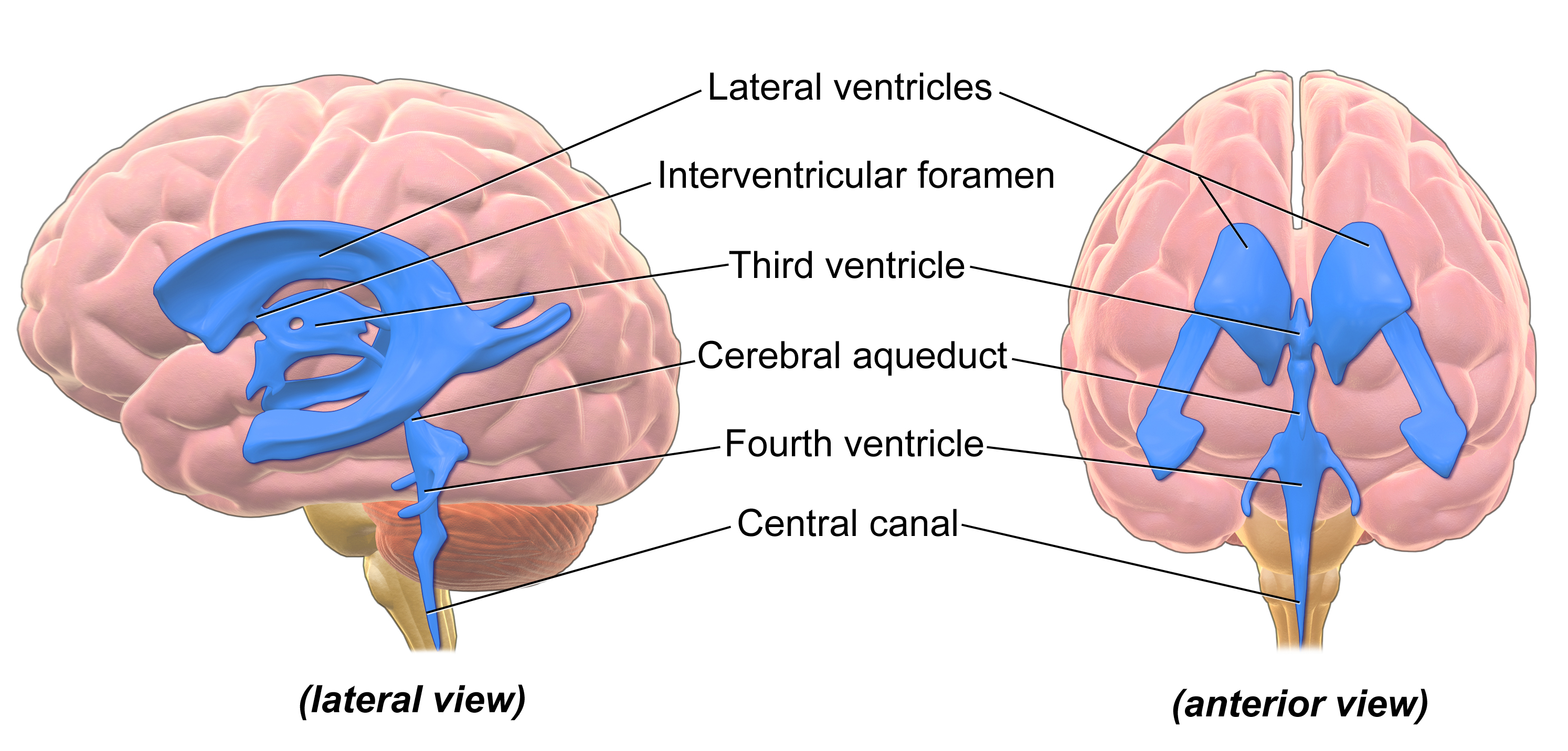
Ventricles of the brain

Aging entails many physical, biological, chemical, and psychological changes and the brain is no exception to this phenomenon. These various changes have attempted to be mapped by conceptual models like the Scaffolding Theory of Aging and Cognition (STAC) in 2009. The STAC model looks at factors like neural changes to the white matter, dopamine depletion, shrinkage, and cortical thinning. CT scans have found that the cerebral ventricles expand as a function of age. More recent MRI studies have reported age-related regional decreases in cerebral volume. Regional volume reduction is not uniform; some brain regions shrink at a rate of up to 1% per year, whereas others remain relatively stable until the end of the life-span. The brain is very complex, and is composed of many different areas and types of tissue, or matter. The different functions of different tissues in the brain may be more or less susceptible to age-induced changes. The brain matter can be broadly classified as either grey matter, or white matter. Grey matter consists of cell bodies in the cortex and subcortical nuclei. White matter consists of tightly packed myelinated axons connecting the neurons to each other and with the periphery.

=== Loss of neural circuits and brain plasticity ===
Brain plasticity refers to the brain's ability to change structure and function. This ties into the common phrase, "if you don't use it, you lose it," which is another way of saying, "if you do not use it, your brain will devote less somatotopic space for it". One proposed mechanism for the observed age-related plasticity deficits in animals is the result of age-induced alterations in calcium regulation. The changes in the organism's abilities to handle calcium will ultimately influence neuronal firing and the ability to propagate action potentials, which in turn would affect the ability of the brain to alter its structure or function (i.e. its plastic nature). Due to the complexity of the brain, with all of its structures and functions, it is logical to assume that some areas would be more vulnerable to aging than others. Two circuits worth mentioning here are the hippocampal and neocortical circuits. It has been suggested that age-related cognitive decline is due in part not to neuronal death but to synaptic alterations. Evidence in support of this idea from animal work has also suggested that this cognitive deficit is due to functional and biochemical factors such as changes in enzymatic activity, chemical messengers, or gene expression in cortical circuits.

=== Thinning of the cortex ===
Lobes of the human brain

Advances in MRI technology have provided the ability to see the brain structure in great detail in an easy, non-invasive manner in vivo. Bartzokis et al., has noted that there is a decrease in grey matter volume between adulthood and old age, whereas white matter volume was found to increase from age 19–40, and decline after this age. Studies using Voxel-based morphometry have identified areas such as the insula and superior parietal gyri as being especially vulnerable to age-related losses in grey matter of older adults. Sowell et al., reported that the first 6 decades of an individual's life were correlated with the most rapid decreases in grey matter density, and this occurred over dorsal, frontal, and parietal lobes on both interhemispheric and lateral brain surfaces. It is also worth noting that areas such as the cingulate gyrus, and occipital cortex surrounding the calcarine sulcus appear exempt from this decrease in grey matter density over time. Age effects on grey matter density in the posterior temporal cortex appear more predominantly in the left versus right hemisphere, and were confined to posterior language cortices. Certain language functions such as word retrieval and production were found to be located to more anterior language cortices, and deteriorate as a function of age. Sowell et al., also reported that these anterior language cortices were found to mature and decline earlier than the more posterior language cortices. It has also been found that the width of sulcus not only increases with age, but also with cognitive decline in the elderly.

=== Morphology and microstructure ===
Age-related decrease in gray matter volume was the largest contribution to changes in brain volume. Moreover, neuronal density appears to decrease, white matter microstructure gets altered and energy metabolism in the cerebellum gets altered. General cortical atrophy occurs in aging and e.g. the caudate nucleus volume appears to decrease.

=== Age-related neuronal morphology ===
There is converging evidence from cognitive neuroscientists around the world that age-induced cognitive deficits may not be due to neuronal loss or cell death, but rather may be the result of small region-specific changes to the morphology of neurons. Studies by Duan et al., have shown that dendritic arbors and dendritic spines of cortical pyramidal neurons decrease in size and/or number in specific regions and layers of human and non-human primate cortex as a result of age (Duan et al., 2003; morph). A 46% decrease in spine number and spine density has been reported in humans older than 50 compared with younger individuals. An electron microscopy study in monkeys reported a 50% loss in spines on the apical dendritic tufts of pyramidal cells in prefrontal cortex of old animals (27–32 years old) compared with young ones (6–9 years old).

==== Neurofibrillary tangles ====
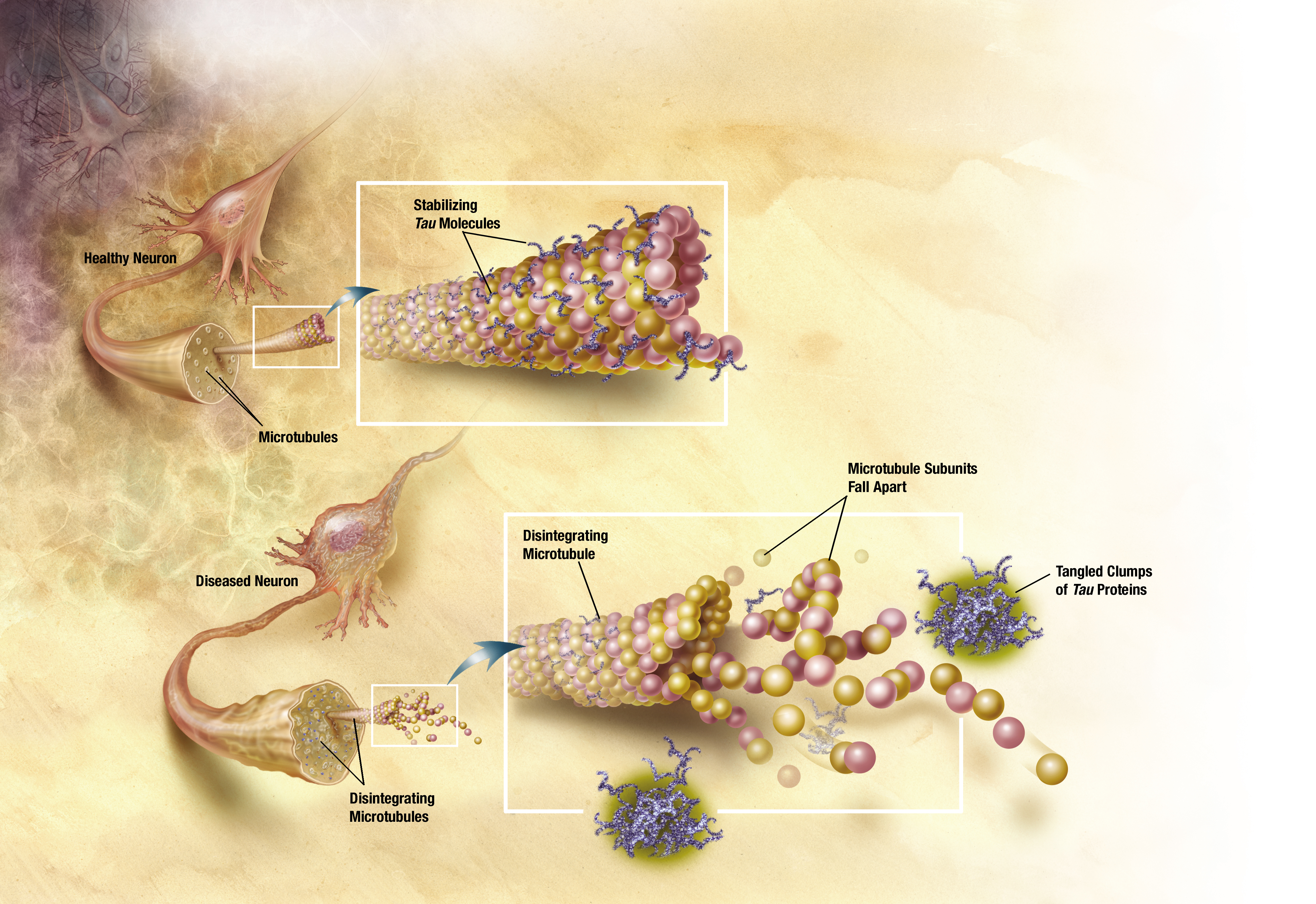
Tau protein disorders cause microtubule destruction and formation of neurofibrillary tangles.

Age-related neuropathologies such as Alzheimer's disease, Parkinson's disease, diabetes, hypertension and arteriosclerosis make it difficult to distinguish the normal patterns of aging. One of the important differences between normal aging and pathological aging is the location of neurofibrillary tangles. Neurofibrillary tangles are composed of paired helical filaments (PHF). In normal, non-demented aging, the number of tangles in each affected cell body is relatively low and restricted to the olfactory nucleus, parahippocampal gyrus, amygdala and entorhinal cortex. As the non-demented individual ages, there is a general increase in the density of tangles, but no significant difference in where tangles are found.

The other main neurodegenerative contributor commonly found in the brain of patients with AD is amyloid plaques. However, unlike tangles, plaques have not been found to be a consistent feature of normal aging.

=== Role of oxidative stress ===
Cognitive impairment has been attributed to oxidative stress, inflammatory reactions and changes in the cerebral microvasculature. The exact impact of each of these mechanisms in affecting cognitive aging is unknown. Oxidative stress is the most controllable risk factor and is the best understood. The online Merriam-Webster Medical Dictionary defines oxidative stress as, "physiological stress on the body that is caused by the cumulative damage done by free radicals inadequately neutralized by antioxidants and that is held to be associated with aging." Hence oxidative stress is the damage done to the cells by free radicals that have been released from the oxidation process.

Compared to other tissues in the body, the brain is deemed unusually sensitive to oxidative damage. Increased oxidative damage has been associated with neurodegenerative diseases, mild cognitive impairment and individual differences in cognition in healthy elderly people. In 'normal aging', the brain is undergoing oxidative stress in a multitude of ways. The main contributors include protein oxidation, lipid peroxidation and oxidative modifications in nuclear and mitochondrial DNA. Oxidative stress can damage DNA replication and inhibit repair through many complex processes, including telomere shortening in DNA components. Each time a somatic cell replicates, the telomeric DNA component shortens. As telomere length is partly inheritable, there are individual differences in the age of onset of cognitive decline.

=== DNA damage ===
At least 25 studies have demonstrated that DNA damage accumulates with age in the mammalian brain. This DNA damage includes the oxidized nucleoside 8-hydroxydeoxyguanosine (8-OHdG), single- and double-strand breaks, DNA-protein cross-links and malondialdehyde adducts (reviewed in Bernstein et al.). Increasing DNA damage with age has been reported in the brains of the mouse, rat, gerbil, rabbit, dog, and human. Young 4-day-old rats have about 3,000 single-strand breaks and 156 double-strand breaks per neuron, whereas in rats older than 2 years the level of damage increases to about 7,400 single-strand breaks and 600 double-strand breaks per neuron.

Lu et al. studied the transcriptional profiles of the human frontal cortex of individuals ranging from 26 to 106 years of age. This led to the identification of a set of genes whose expression was altered after age 40. They further found that the promoter sequences of these particular genes accumulated oxidative DNA damage, including 8-OHdG, with age (see DNA damage theory of aging). They concluded that DNA damage may reduce the expression of selectively vulnerable genes involved in learning, memory and neuronal survival, initiating a pattern of brain aging that starts early in life.

== Immune system and fluids ==
Blood–brain barrier permeability, neuroinflammation and neurodegeneration, and gut microbiota-induced systemic chronic inflammation appear to be linked and interact with aging, e.g. as gut microbiota homeostasis could be disturbed by increasing age. According to a review, neuroinflammatory changes, "including microglial activation and production of inflammatory cytokines", occur with normal aging.

=== Fluids ===
Cerebral blood flow was shown to decrease 0.3-0.5% per year in healthy ageing. An efficiently functioning glymphatic system, involved in waste clearance, may be important for maintaining brain health and its transport efficiency appears to be declining with aging. Factors in the circulation have been shown to modulate ageing and to rejuvenate the brain.

== Chemical changes ==
Major dopamine pathways. As part of the reward pathway, dopamine is manufactured in nerve cell bodies located within VTA and is released in the nucleus accumbens and the prefrontal cortex. The motor functions of dopamine are linked to a separate pathway, with cell bodies in the substantia nigra that manufacture and release dopamine into the striatum.

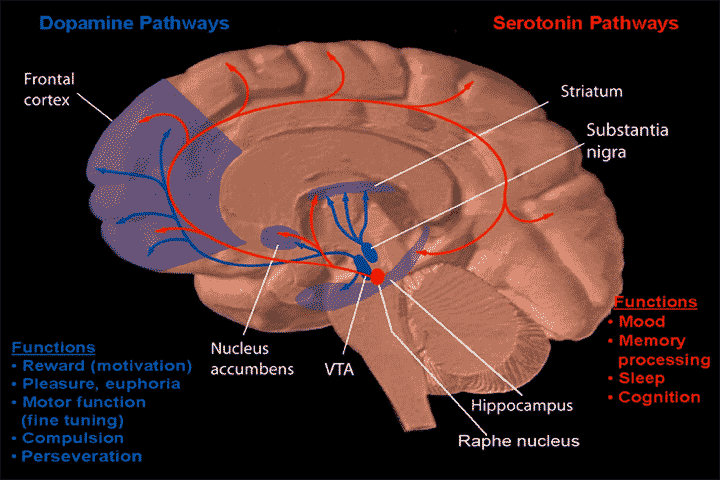
Dopamine and serotonin functions and pathways

In addition to the structural changes that the brain incurs with age, the aging process also entails a broad range of biochemical changes. More specifically, neurons communicate with each other via specialized chemical messengers called neurotransmitters. Several studies have identified a number of these neurotransmitters, as well as their receptors, that exhibit a marked alteration in different regions of the brain as part of the normal aging process.

=== Dopamine ===
An overwhelming number of studies have reported age-related changes in dopamine synthesis, binding sites, and number of receptors. Studies using positron emission tomography (PET) in living human subjects have shown a significant age-related decline in dopamine synthesis, notably in the striatum and extrastriatal regions (excluding the midbrain). Significant age-related decreases in dopamine receptors D_{1}, D_{2}, and D_{3} have also been highly reported. A general decrease in D_{1} and D_{2} receptors has been shown, and more specifically a decrease of D_{1} and D_{2} receptor binding in the caudate nucleus and putamen. A general decrease in D_{1} receptor density has also been shown to occur with age. Significant age-related declines in dopamine receptors, D_{2} and D_{3} were detected in the anterior cingulate cortex, frontal cortex, lateral temporal cortex, hippocampus, medial temporal cortex, amygdala, medial thalamus, and lateral thalamus. One study also indicated a significant inverse correlation between dopamine binding in the occipital cortex and age. Postmortem studies also show that the number of D_{1} and D_{2} receptors decline with age in both the caudate nucleus and the putamen, although the ratio of these receptors did not show age-related changes. The loss of dopamine with age is thought to be responsible for many neurological symptoms that increase in frequency with age, such as decreased arm swing and increased rigidity. Changes in dopamine levels may also cause age-related changes in cognitive flexibility.

=== Serotonin ===
Decreasing levels of different serotonin receptors and the serotonin transporter (5-HTT), have also been shown to occur with age. Studies conducted using PET methods on humans, in vivo, show that levels of the 5-HT_{2} receptor in the caudate nucleus, putamen, and frontal cerebral cortex, decline with age. A decreased binding capacity of the 5-HT_{2} receptor in the frontal cortex was also found, as well as a decreased binding capacity of the serotonin transporter (5-HHT) in the thalamus and the midbrain. Postmortem studies on humans have indicated decreased binding capacities of serotonin and a decrease in the number of S_{1} receptors in the frontal cortex and hippocampus as well as a decrease in affinity in the putamen.

=== Glutamate ===
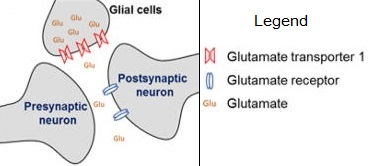
Expression of glutamate transporter 1 in glial cell facilitates reuptake of glutamate and decreases extracellular glutamate concentration

Glutamate is another neurotransmitter that tends to decrease with age. Studies have shown older subjects to have lower glutamate concentration in the motor cortex compared to younger subjects. A significant age-related decline especially in the parietal gray matter, basal ganglia, and to a lesser degree, the frontal white matter, has also been noted. Although these levels were studied in the normal human brain, the parietal and basal ganglia regions are often affected in degenerative brain diseases associated with aging and it has therefore been suggested that brain glutamate may be useful as a marker of brain diseases that are affected by aging.

== Neuropsychological changes ==
=== Changes in orientation ===
Orientation is defined as the awareness of self in relation to one's surroundings. Often orientation is examined by distinguishing whether a person has a sense of time, place, and person. Deficits in orientation are one of the most common symptoms of brain disease, hence tests of orientation are included in almost all medical and neuropsychological evaluations. While research has primarily focused on levels of orientation among clinical populations, a small number of studies have examined whether there is a normal decline in orientation among healthy aging adults. Results have been somewhat inconclusive. Some studies suggest that orientation does not decline over the lifespan. For example, in one study 92% of normal elderly adults (65–84 years) presented with perfect or near perfect orientation. However some data suggest that mild changes in orientation may be a normal part of aging. For example, Sweet and colleagues concluded that "older persons with normal, healthy memory may have mild orientation difficulties. In contrast, younger people with normal memory have virtually no orientation problems" (p. 505). So although current research suggests that normal aging is not usually associated with significant declines in orientation, mild difficulties may be a part of normal aging and not necessarily a sign of a particular pathology.

=== Changes in attention ===
Many older adults notice a decline in their attentional abilities. Attention is a broad construct that refers to "the cognitive ability that allows us to deal with the inherent processing limitations of the human brain by selecting information for further processing". Since the human brain has limited resources, people use their attention to zone in on specific stimuli and block out others.

If older adults have fewer attentional resources than younger adults, we would expect that when two tasks must be carried out at the same time, older adults' performance will decline more than that of younger adults. However, a large review of studies on cognition and aging suggest that this hypothesis has not been wholly supported. While some studies have found that older adults have a more difficult time encoding and retrieving information when their attention is divided, other studies have not found meaningful differences from younger adults. Similarly, one might expect older adults to do poorly on tasks of sustained attention, which measure the ability to attend to and respond to stimuli for an extended period of time. However, studies suggest that sustained attention shows no decline with age. Results suggest that sustained attention increases in early adulthood and then remains relatively stable, at least to the middle of the eighth decade of life. More research is needed on how normal aging impacts attention after age eighty.

It is worth noting that there are factors other than true attentional abilities that might relate to difficulty paying attention. For example, it is possible that sensory deficits impact older adults' attentional abilities. In other words, impaired hearing or vision may make it more difficult for older adults to do well on tasks of visual and verbal attention.

=== Changes in memory ===
Many different types of memory have been identified in humans, such as declarative memory (including episodic memory and semantic memory), working memory, spatial memory, and procedural memory. Studies done, have found that memory functions, more specifically those associated with the medial temporal lobe are especially vulnerable to age-related decline. A number of studies utilizing a variety of methods such as histological, structural imaging, functional imaging, and receptor binding have supplied converging evidence that the frontal lobes and frontal-striatal dopaminergic pathways are especially affected by age-related processes resulting in memory changes.

=== Changes in language ===
Changes in performance on verbal tasks, as well as the location, extent, and signal intensity of BOLD signal changes measured with functional MRI, vary in predictable patterns with age. For example, behavioral changes associated with age include compromised performance on tasks related to word retrieval, comprehension of sentences with high syntactic and/or working memory demands, and production of such sentences.

=== Brain activation patterns ===
The left inferior frontal junction and left anterior cuneus/precuneus were the only regions in a larger set of regions associated with executive functions, that consistently showed age differences in brain activity.

=== Changes in learning and behavioral flexibility ===
Learning is often more efficient in children and takes longer or is more difficult with age. A study using neuroimaging identified rapid neurotransmitter GABA boosting as a major potential explanation-component for why that is.

Behavioral flexibility can refer to efficiently and appropriately adapting to different situations and changing environmental demands, including the speed of adaptation, and to the capacity to develop solutions to novel problems or novel solutions to old problems. Studies indicate late-stage aging, and/or late-life dementias, decreases behavioral flexibility and impair deliberation about courses of action.

== Genetic changes ==
Variation in the effects of aging among individuals can be attributed to both genetic, health, and environmental factors. As in so many other science disciplines, the nature versus nurture debate is an ongoing conflict in the field of cognitive neuroscience. The search for genetic factors has always been an important aspect in trying to understand neuropathological processes. Research focused on discovering the genetic component in developing Autosomal Dominant (AD) has also contributed greatly to the understanding the genetics behind normal or "non-pathological" aging.

Autosomal Dominant (AD) - Autosomal dominant is a pattern of inheritance characteristic of some genetic disorders. "Autosomal" means that the gene in question is located on one of the numbered, or non-sex, chromosomes. "Dominant" means that a single copy of the mutated gene (from one parent) is enough to cause the disorder.

The human brain shows a decline in function and a change in gene expression. This modulation in gene expression may be due to oxidative DNA damage at promoter regions in the genome. Genes that are down-regulated over the age of 40 include:

- GluR1 AMPA receptor subunit
- NMDA R2A receptor subunit (involved in learning)
- Subunits of the GABA-A receptor
- Genes involved in long-term potentiation e.g. calmodulin 1 and CaM Kinase II alpha
- Calcium signaling genes
- Synaptic plasticity genes
- Synaptic vesicle release and recycling genes

Genes that are upregulated include:

- Genes associated with stress response and DNA repair
- Antioxidant defence

== Measurement ==
=== Epigenetic age analysis of brain regions ===
The cerebellum is the youngest brain region (and probably body part) in centenarians according to an epigenetic biomarker of tissue age known as epigenetic clock: it is about 15 years younger than expected in a centenarian. By contrast, all brain regions and brain cells appear to have roughly the same epigenetic age in subjects who are younger than 80. These findings suggest that the cerebellum is better protected from aging effects, which in turn could explain why the cerebellum exhibits fewer neuropathological hallmarks of age related dementias compared to other brain regions.

=== Other ===
There is research and development of biomarkers of aging, detection systems and software systems to measure biological age of the brain. For example, a deep learning software using anatomic magnetic resonance images estimated brain age with relatively high accuracy, including detecting early signs of Alzheimer's disease and varying neuroanatomical patterns of neurological aging.

== Delaying the effects of aging ==
The current state of biomedical technology does not allow to stop and reverse aging. However, one may potentially delay the effects and severity of its symptoms. While there is no consensus of efficacy, the following are reported as delaying cognitive decline:

- High level of education
- Physical exercise
- Staying intellectually engaged, i.e. reading and mental activities (such as crossword puzzles)
- Maintaining social and friendship networks
- Maintaining a healthy diet, including omega-3 fatty acids, protective antioxidants and e.g. flavonols-containing foods as well as potentially anthocyanins- and flavanones-containing ones as in, more generally, Mediterranean diet patterns
- Limiting stress, adequate sleep, managing sensory impairments, smoking cessation, limiting alcohol use, brain protection, treating cardiovascular risk factors
- Avoiding anticholinergic medications
- A number of pharmacological strategies are under investigation, including nicotinamide riboside
- Caloric restriction and intermittent fasting
- The microbiome also plays a role. Scientists have shown that transplantation of fecal microbiota from young donor mice into aged recipient mice substantially rejuvenates brain biomarkers of the latter, complementing similar results of a 2020 study. Diet and other factors influence the microbiome. Probiotics such as of L. plantarum may also have relevant effects.

=== Cognitive reserve ===
The ability of an individual to demonstrate attenuated cognitive signs of aging despite an aging brain is called cognitive reserve. This hypothesis suggests that two patients might have the same brain pathology, with one person experiencing noticeable clinical symptoms, while the other continues to function relatively normally. Studies of cognitive reserve explore the specific biological, genetic and environmental differences which make some people more resistant to cognitive decline than others.

Intellectual quotients derived from psychometric testing have been identified as valuable proxy measures of cognitive reserve, with higher scores relative to the mean being associated with slower rates of cognitive decline. However, the rate of decline in some cognitive subdomains, such as processing speed, may be less affected by premorbid IQ. The degree of association between IQ and cognitive reserve may vary between different types of dementia.

=== Research ===
==== "Super Agers" ====
Longitudinal research studies have recently conducted genetic analyses of centenarians and their offspring to identify protective factors against the negative effects of aging. In particular, the CETP gene is linked to prevention of cognitive decline and Alzheimer's disease. Specifically, valine CETP homozygotes but not heterozygotes experienced a relative 51% less decline in memory compared to a reference group after adjusting for demographic factors and APOE status.

==== Nun Study ====
A study funded by the National Institute on Aging (NIA) began in 1986 and followed a group of 678 Roman Catholic sisters and recorded the effects of aging. The researchers used autobiographical essays collected as the nuns joined their Sisterhood. Findings suggest that early idea density, defined by number of ideas expressed and use of complex prepositions in these essays, was a significant predictor of lower risk for developing Alzheimer's disease in old age. Lower idea density was found to be significantly associated with lower brain weight, higher cerebral atrophy, and more neurofibrillary tangles.

In 1994, Religious Orders Study has begun. Its initial funding was also provided by NIA.

==== Inflammation ====
A study found that myeloid cells are drivers of a maladaptive inflammation element of brain-ageing in mice and that this can be reversed or prevented via inhibition of their EP2 signalling.

==== Cerebrospinal fluid ====
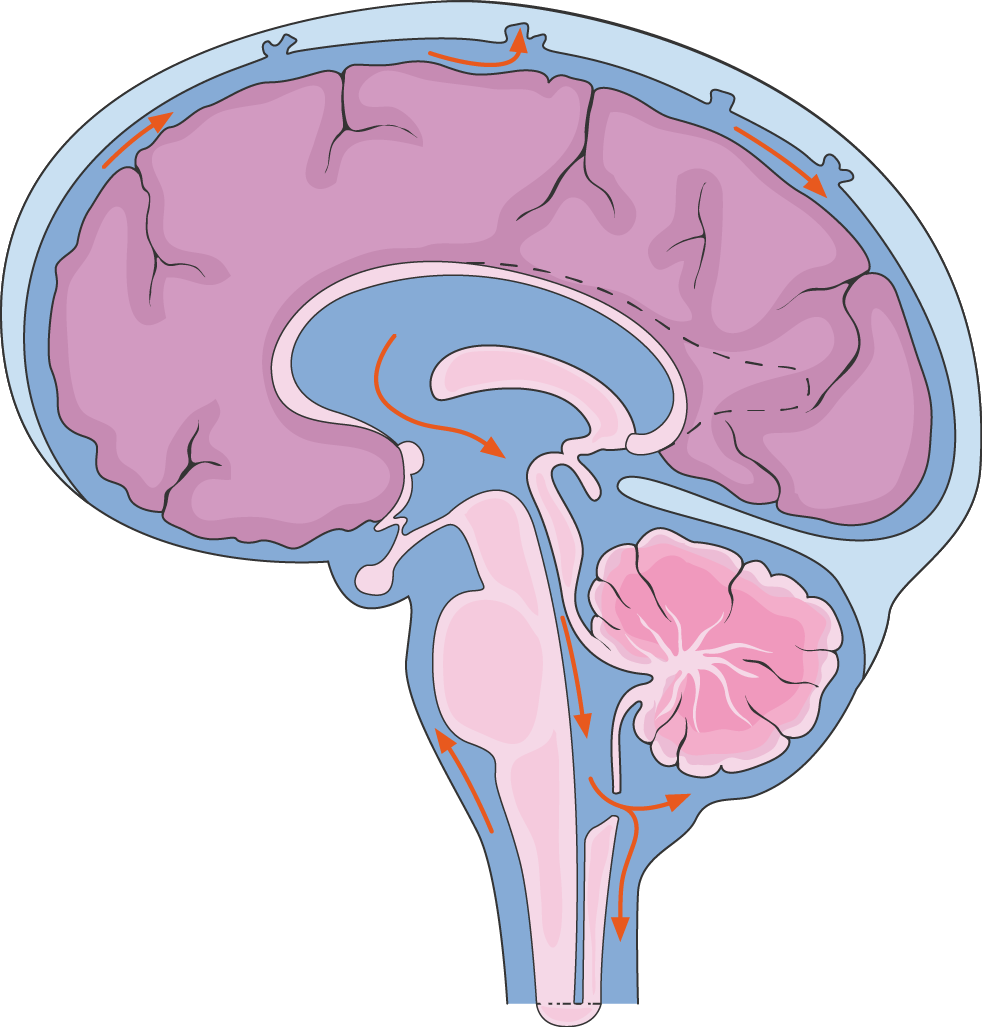
The cerebrospinal fluid circulates in the subarachnoid space around the brain and spinal cord, and in the ventricles of the brain

A study showed that infusing the nourishing cerebrospinal fluid from around brain cells of young mice into aged brains rejuvenates aspects of the brain, proving that it play a role in brain aging and inter alia identifying a protein FGF17 as a key target for potential therapeutics, including for anti-aging.

The subarachnoidal lymphatic-like membrane, whose discovery was reported around 2023, likely plays a role in cerebrospinal fluid functions and, as both a protective barrier and a host of immune cells that monitor the brain for infection and inflammation, appears to be substantially involved in major brain diseases and brain aging. It is "the host for a large population of myeloid cells [], the number of which increases in response to inflammation and aging".

== Aging disparities ==
For certain demographics, the effects of normal cognitive aging are especially pronounced. Differences in cognitive aging might be tied to the lack of or reduced access to medical care and, as a result, suffer disproportionately from negative health outcomes. As the global population grows, diversifies, and grays, there is an increasing need to understand these inequities.

=== Race ===
==== African Americans ====
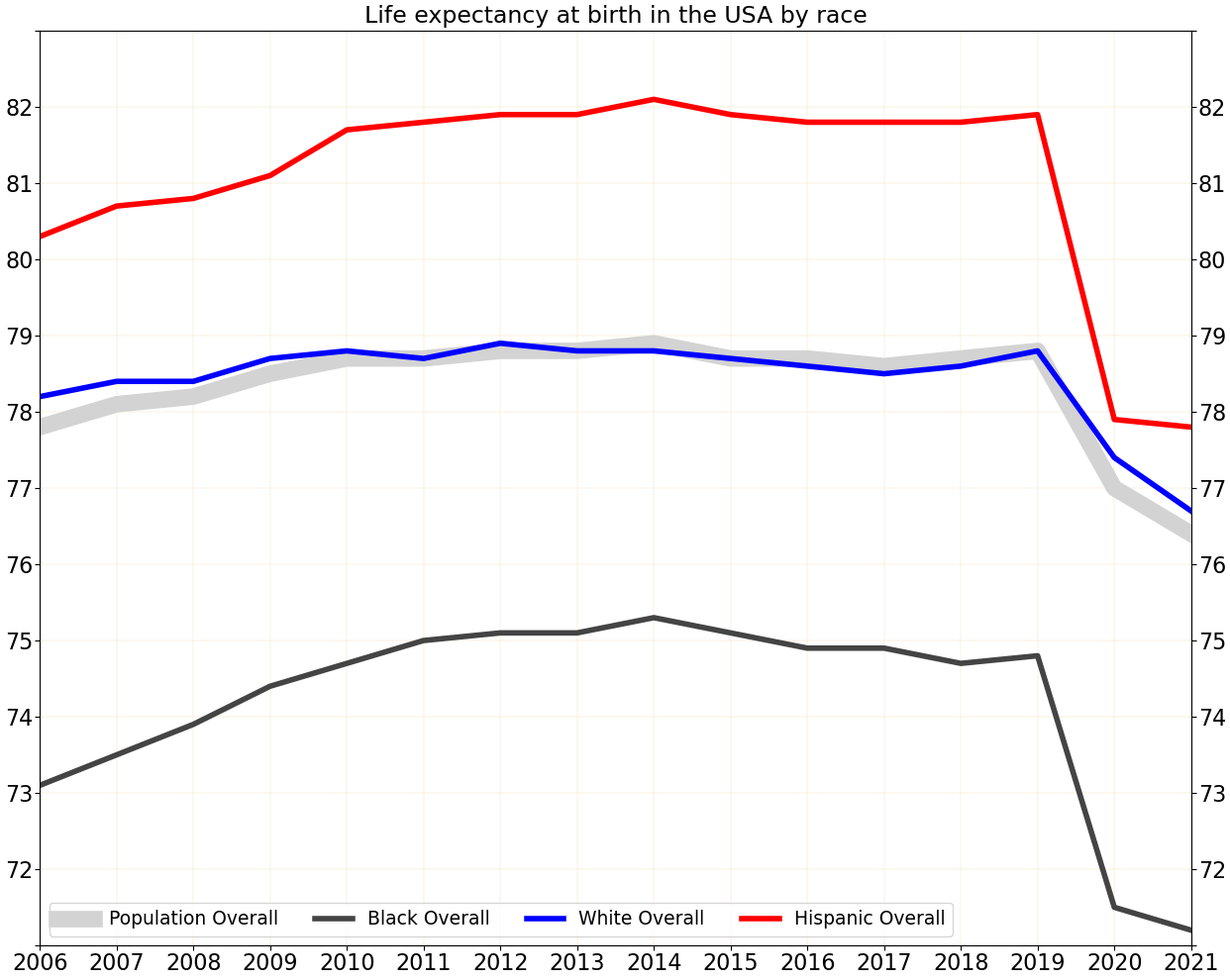
Life expectancy in the US by race

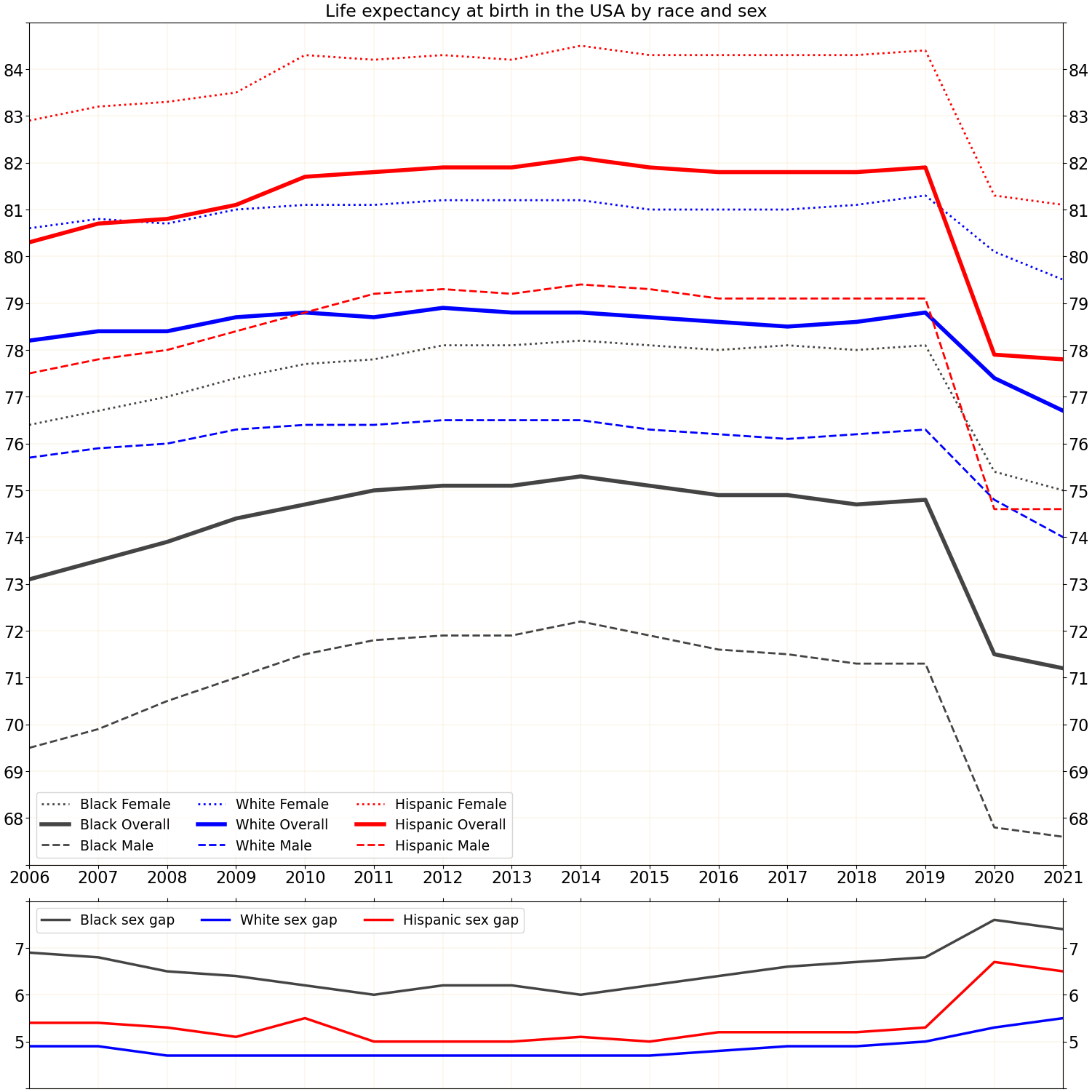
Life expectancy in the US by race and sex, with calculated sex gap

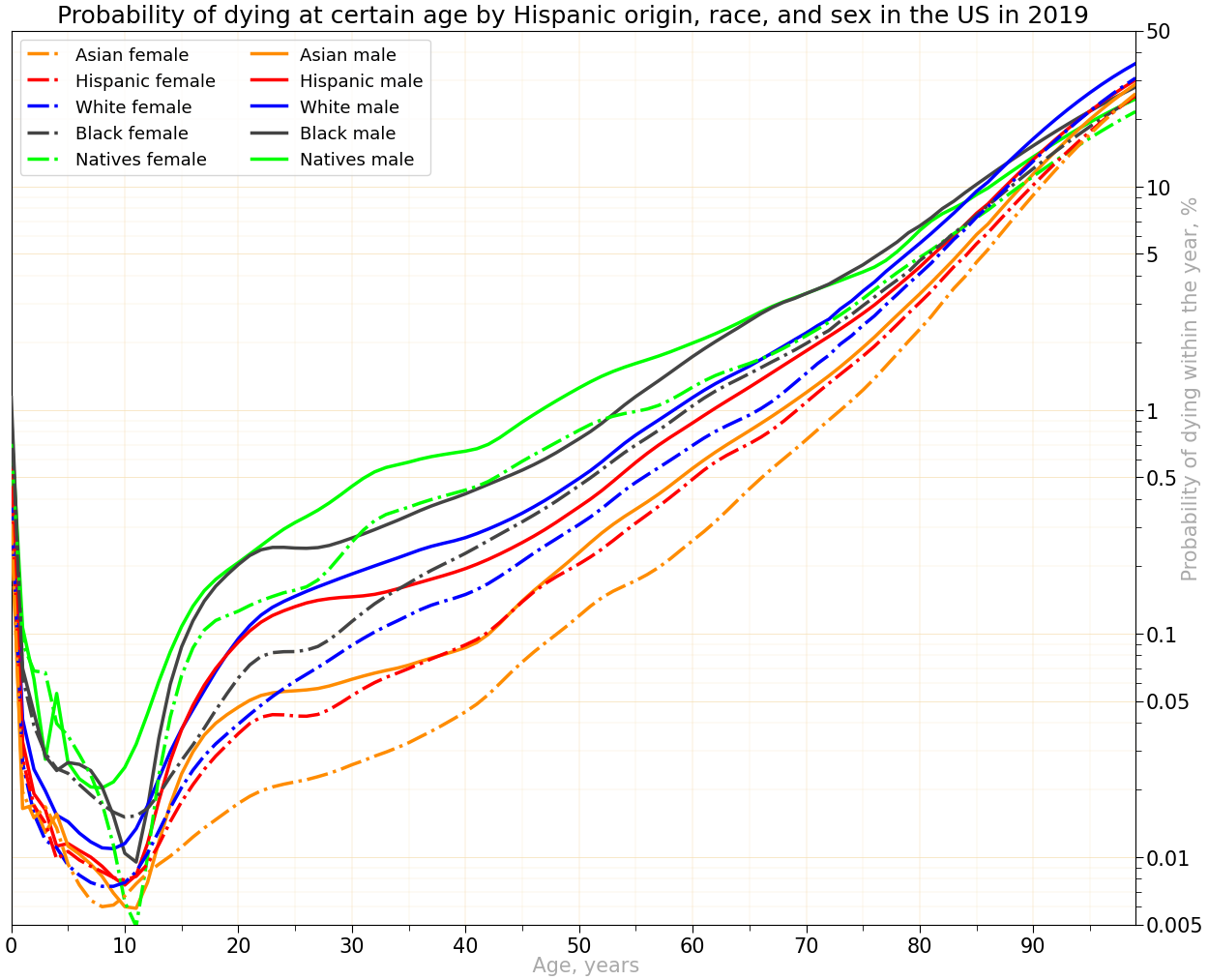
Probability of dying at various ages in the US in 2024 by race and sex. See also male-only and female-only versions of the chart.

In the United States, Black and African American demographics disproportionately experience metabolic dysfunction with age. This has many downstream effects, but the most prominent of these is the toll on cardiovascular health. Metabolite profiles of the healthy aging index - a score that assesses neurocognitive function, among other correlates of health through the years - are associated with cardiovascular disease. Healthy cardiovascular function is critical for maintaining neurocognitive efficiency into old age. Attention, verbal learning, and cognitive set ability are related to diastolic blood pressure, triglyceride levels, and HDL cholesterol levels, respectively.

==== Latinos ====
In the US, the Latino demographic is most likely to develop metabolic syndrome - the combination of high blood pressure, high blood sugar, elevated triglyceride levels, and abdominal obesity - which not only increases the risk of cardiac events and type 2 diabetes but also is associated with lower neurocognitive function during midlife. This takes place even though life expectancy for Latinos in the US is higher than for white and black.

Among different Latin heritages, frequency of the dementia-predisposing ε4 allele of apoE4 gene was highest for Caribbean Latinos (Cubans, Dominicans, Puerto Ricans, 12.6–17.5 %) and lowest among mainland Latinos (Mexicans, Central Americans, and South Americans, 11.0–11.2 %). At the same time, frequency of the neuroprotective ε2 allele was also highest for Caribbean Latinos (5.2–8.6 %) and lowest for those of mainland heritage (2.9–3.9 %). Among mainland Latinos, the most prevalent is the "median" ε3 allele: 85.2–86.2 % compared to 73.9–81.5% among Caribbean Latinos.

==== Indigenous peoples ====
Indigenous populations are often understudied in research. Reviews of current literature studying natives in Australia, Brazil, Canada, and the United States from participants aged 45 to 94 years old reveal varied prevalence rates for cognitive impairment not related to dementia, from 4.4% to 17.7%. These results can be interpreted in the context of culturally biased neurocognitive tests, preexisting health conditions, poor access to healthcare, lower educational attainment, and/or old age.

=== Sex ===
Compared to their male counterparts, women's scores on the mini–mental state examination (MMSE) tend to decline at slightly faster rates with age. Males with mild cognitive impairment tend to show more microstructural damage than females with MCI, but seem to have a greater cognitive reserve due to larger absolute brain size and neuronal density. As a result, women tend to manifest symptoms of cognitive decline at lower thresholds than men do. This effect seems to be moderated by educational attainment - higher education is associated with later diagnosis of mild cognitive impairment as neuropathological load increases. Currently there are no known studies to identify a characteristic pattern of cognitive decline with age in transgender people.

=== Socioeconomic factors ===
Socioeconomic status is the interaction between social and economic factors. It has been demonstrated that socio-demographic factors can be used to predict cognitive profiles within older individuals to some extent. This may be because families of higher socioeconomic status (SES) are equipped to provide their children with resources early on to facilitate cognitive development. For children in families of low SES, relatively small changes in parental income were associated with large changes in brain surface area; these losses were seen in areas associated with language, reading, executive functions, and spatial skills. Meanwhile, for children in families of high SES, small changes in parental income were associated with small changes in surface area within these regions. With respect to global cortical thickness, low SES children showed a curvilinear decrease in thickness with age while those of high SES demonstrated a steeper linear decline, suggesting that synaptic pruning is more efficient in the latter group. This trend was especially evident in the left fusiform and left superior temporal gyri - critical language and literacy supporting areas.

A study showed that 50+ aged users of the dietary program SNAP "had about 2 fewer years of cognitive aging over a 10-year period compared with non-users" despite it having nearly no conditions for the sustainability and healthiness of the food products purchased with the coupons (or coupon-credits).

== See also ==
- Aging movement control
- Hallmarks of aging
- Life extension
- Lifelong learning
- Timeline of senescence research
- List of life extension related topics
- Neuropsychological test
- Reliability theory of aging and longevity
- Sensory stimulation therapy
- Neuroscience of aging

== Notes ==
1. usually spelled ageing brain in British English
