= Neurotrophic hypothesis of depression =

Theory on depression

The neurotrophic hypothesis of depression proposes that major depressive disorder (MDD) is caused, at least partly, by impaired neurotrophic support. Neurotrophic factors (also known as neurotrophins) are a family of closely related proteins which regulate the survival, development, and function of neurons in both the central and peripheral nervous systems.

== Inadequacy of the monoamine hypothesis of depression ==
Depression is commonly attributed to a deficiency in monoamines, such as serotonin

The monoamine hypothesis of depression suggests that depression is primarily caused by a deficiency of several monoamines, namely serotonin, dopamine and norepinephrine. This hypothesis is widely accepted due to its simplicity. However, the monoamine hypothesis of depression is considered incomplete, as several lines of evidence suggest that a monoamine deficiency cannot be the sole cause of depression. For example, antidepressants usually take several weeks to exert a noticeable effect, which is inconsistent with the fact that monoamine levels start to increase within hours of using antidepressants. This suggests that antidepressants need to influence other biological systems, apart from monoamines, to improve a patient's mental health.

== The role of BDNF in depression ==
Brain-derived neurotrophic factor (BDNF) is a neurotrophin that is vital to the survival, growth, and maintenance of neurons in key brain circuits involved in emotional and cognitive function. BDNF has been studied more than other neurotrophic factors for its potential role in depression. Altered BDNF function and levels are implicated in depression, as suggested by several lines of evidence.

Depression is associated with a decrease in hippocampal volume due to neuronal atrophy. Decreased levels of BDNF in the hippocampus may contribute to this neuronal atrophy. In contrast, increased BDNF levels in the hippocampus may enhance neurogenesis, neuronal cell survival and dendritic branching.

Suicide victims have been found to have decreased levels of:

- BDNF mRNA and BDNF proteins
- TrkB (receptor for BDNF)
- CREB (transcription factor which activates BDNF)
  Individuals with the BDNF Val66Met polymorphism have been found to have decreased hippocampal volume.

Individuals with the BDNF Val66Met polymorphism are more susceptible to depression, anxiety and bipolar disorder. Furthermore, people with these gene have been found to have decreased hippocampal volume, which is a common structural change associated with depression. This genes results in decreased activity-dependent secretion of BDNF.

In humans, BDNF increase has been reported for the following classes of antidepressants:

- Selective serotonin reuptake inhibitors
- Norepinephrine reuptake inhibitors
- Serotonin norepinephrine reuptake inhibitors
- Monoamine oxidase inhibitors
- Atypical antidepressants

== Relationship of the neurotrophic hypothesis of depression to other theories ==
The neurotrophic hypothesis of depression is closely related to the neuroplasticity and neurogenesis hypotheses of depression, as both the processes of neuroplasticity and neurogenesis are affected by neurotrophic factors.

== See also ==
- Neurotrophic factors
- Brain derived neurotrophic factor
- Neuroplasticity
- Neurogenesis
- Neurogenesis hypothesis of depression
