= Sensory stimulation therapy =

Experimental therapy technique

Sensory stimulation therapy (SST) is an experimental therapy that aims to use neural plasticity mechanisms to aid in the recovery of somatosensory function after stroke or cognitive ageing. Stroke and cognitive ageing are well known sources of cognitive loss, the former by neuronal death, the latter by weakening of neural connections. SST stimulates a specific sense at a specific frequency. Research suggests that this technique may reverse cognitive ageing by up to 30 years, and may selectively improve or impair two point discrimination thresholds.

== History and motivation ==
By 2025, it is estimated that 34 million people in the United States will have dementia. It is extremely important, then, that we establish an effective treatment for people with such symptoms to either reduce, or diminish dementia altogether. In modern-day treatment not involving pharmacological treatment, psychosocial therapies are a great intervention. With psychosocial therapies such as massage, aromatherapy, multi-sensory stimulation, music therapy, and reality orientation, treatment of dementia and dementia related diseases has become possible in a less traditional yet non-pharmacological form. It was once believed that the brain was largely unchanging and that its function was decided at a young age. Along this train of thought, cognitive loss from strokes and ageing were viewed as unrecoverable. Functional localization is a theory which suggests that each section of the brain has a specific function, and that loss of a section equates to permanent loss of function. Traditional models even specialize between hemispheres of the brain and describe "artistic and logical sections of the brain." This fatalistic outlook has been dramatically challenged by the recent paradigm of brain plasticity.

Brain plasticity refers to the ability of the brain to restructure itself, form new connections, or adjust the strength of existing connections. The current paradigm allow for conceptualization of brain that is capable of change. Various researchers are using this concept to develop new therapies for conditions that were previously viewed as permanent; for example Paul Bach-y-Rita has worked on devices to give sight to blind individuals, and alleviate a feeling of falling in a patient that has lost function of the vestibular apparatus.

It has been found that many senses have some plastic nature about them. Even auditory cognition has been shown to have some potential for recovery after stroke. A recent study by Sarkamo et al. has shown that listening to music and audio books during early recovery from stroke can result in improved cognition.

This paradigm has opened doors into the previously believed to be impossible; recovery from strokes, reduced cognitive ageing.

== Stroke ==
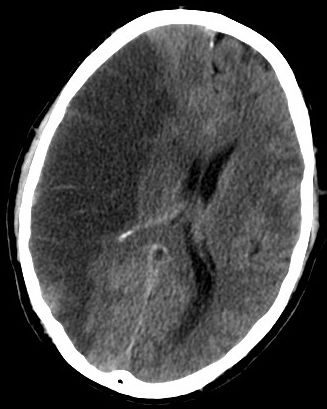
CT scan slice of the brain showing a right-hemispheric ischemic stroke (left side of image).

A stroke can be caused by a few different situations, but the basic result is the same. Blood flow to a section of the brain is stopped, which results in rapid depletion of oxygen and other nutrients in the starved section. The starved section of brain tissue quickly begins to die, and results in a lesion in the brain. The resulting lesion can be traced loss of various cognitive functions depending on the location and area of damage.

It is common for stroke patients to suffer from muscle weakness and loss of muscle function. Some natural recovery has been observed, however training based in advances in neuroscience have shown the most dramatic improvements. These investigational therapies focus on repetition of basic tasks with limited appendages. It is generally found that more intensive remedial function therapies result in the greater restoration to function. fMRI and PET scan studies have shown that after as little as 3 weeks of the intensive training programs there are statistical differences between the experimental group and controls, with observable improvements in muscle control. Although these methods have opened doors for improved quality of life for stroke patients, the training methods are very time, and attention intensive. It would be a powerful tool if one could find a system that does not have massive attention requirements.

== Cognitive ageing ==
During ageing, many brain functions decline and some are lost, this is referred to as cognitive ageing. In the most extreme cases one might think about the catastrophic results of Alzheimer's disease. Age is the largest risk factor for Alzheimer's disease. However, due to lack of knowledge and successful research in this field, little is known about the rates of clinical decline and brain atrophy. This disease is associated with neuronal death. However, more general ageing considers loss of synaptic strength over neuronal death. When considering this situation, the machinery for proper functioning of the brain is still present, but is in disarray. It has been shown that as much as a 46% decrease in dendrite spine number and density can occur in humans over 50 years old when compared to older participants.

== Somatosensory system ==
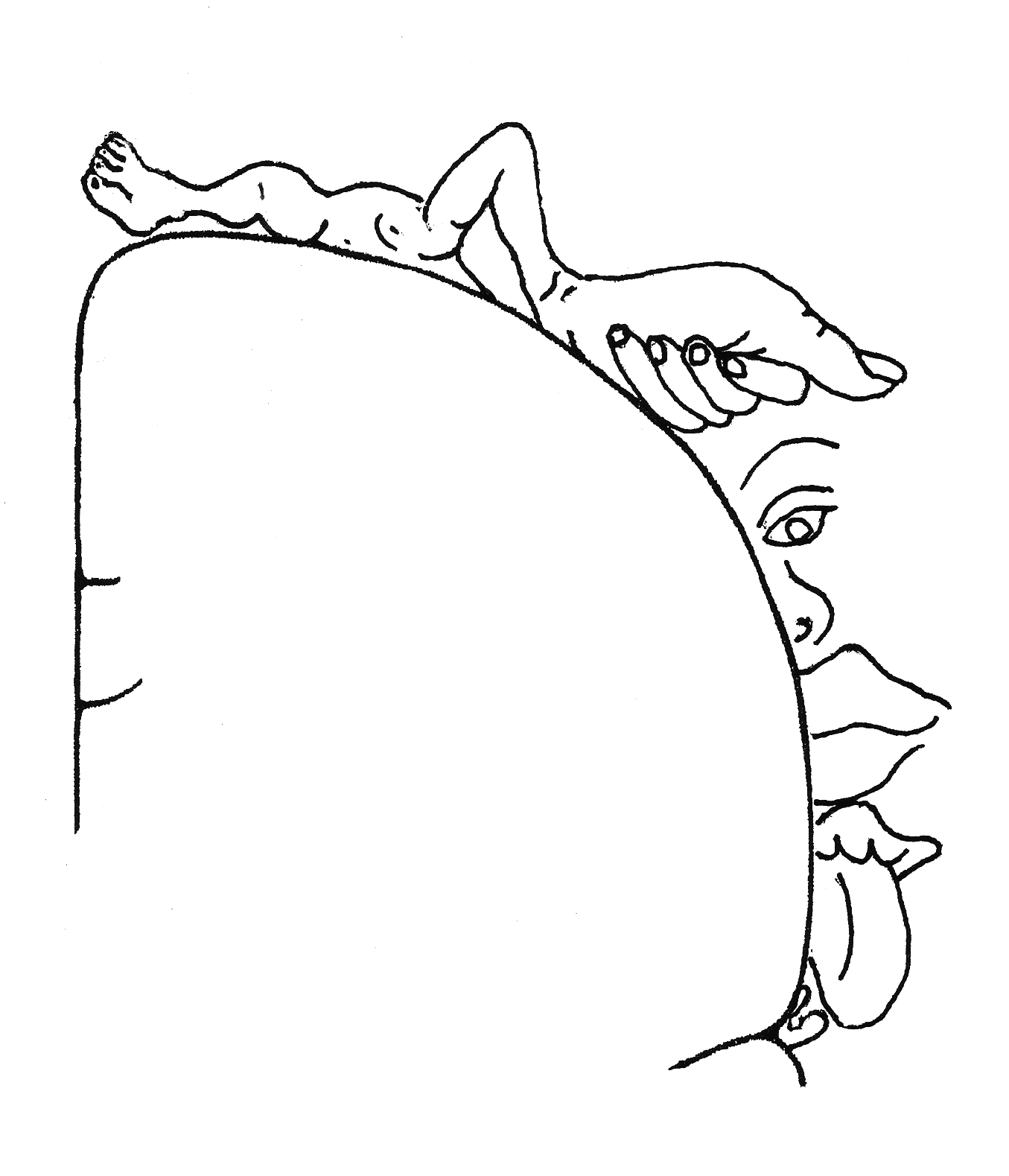
The cortical homunculus, or the visual representation of how your brain sees your body, was discovered by Wilder Penfield

The cortical homunculus, or the visual representation of how your brain sees your body, was discovered by Wilder Penfield. a world-famous brain surgeon. Upon ending his career as part of the McGill medical faculty, he served as the director of Neurological Institute.

The somatosensory system is the part of our sensory system that deals with touch. We would not be able to feel things like temperatures, pain, pressure, vibration, and skin rash without the unwavering help of our somatosensory system. The peripheral nervous system has the ability to understand touch, pressure, vibration, limb position, heat, coldness, and pain. This information is sent through the peripheral nervous system, to the spinal cord where it is finally processed by the brain. One of the key structures in processing this information is the primary somatosensory cortex, which is located in the parietal lobe. The primary somatosensory cortex is known to have subsections that process information from different sections, and the area of the cortex for each section is related to its acuity. This observation is often shown symbolically through a homunculus.

== Sensory stimulation therapies ==
Sensory stimulation uses rapid stimulation of nerves in a section of skin to drive neuronal changes in the participant. The nerves are electrically stimulated in a fashion referred to as coactivation. In both cases the participant's limb, often hand, is constrained in a device that has a section that applies the stimulation. The participant is allowed to go about their daily activities, and many do not mind the presence of the device. These degree of reorganization is often measured through two point discrimination thresholds, which measure the smallest distance between two points that can be felt by the subject.

It has been shown that the use of this technique can rest as much as 30 years of sensory loss. In the study by Dinse et al., 28 patients between the ages of 66 and 86 tested similarly to participants 30 years younger than themselves after treatment. These participants had the device attached for 3 hours while undergoing stimulation. Other studies have used shorter periods of stimulation and achieved similar results.

=== Coactivation ===
A recent study published in the Archives of Physical Medicine and Rehabilitation followed four patients recovering from strokes while undergoing electrical sensory stimulation therapy. Their progress was followed through several different tests; Touch Threshold, Tactile Acuity, Haptic Object Recognition, Pegs placed in peg board and motor tapping tests. It was found that all patients increased their performance during the study. Although this study uses a small sample group, and had no control group it is a first step study that suggests future studies.

Future studies were developed around this study, in which participant's skin was electrically stimulated to induce signals sent to the brain.

=== Frequency studies ===
In January 2008, Ragert et al. explored the impact of frequency of stimulation on sensory stimulation techniques to induce plastic changes. The study investigated if varying the frequency could be used to induce either Long-Term Potentiation (LTP) or Long-term Depression (LTD). LTP refers to the processes by which neuronal connections are formed and strengthened through stimulation and activity. Conversely LTD is a process by which a neuronal pathway is decreased by low levels of stimulation or by disuse.

In the study, Ragert et al. divided their participants into two groups, both of which underwent the SS therapy, but the frequency of stimulation was varied between the two groups. Their analysis showed a statistical improvement in two point discrimination tests for the high frequency group, and a statistical impairment of the same test on the low frequency group. This result brings an interesting possibility to light for the future of this technique; SS could be used to both recover lost sensory function, but also to dull chronic pain.

=== Activity-dependent plasticity and sensory stimulation therapy ===
Activity-dependent plasticity refers the phenomenon by which neuronal connections changes via repetitive use. This form of plasticity has been used by neuro-rehabilitation clinics to help those recovering from strokes; for example The Taub Therapy Clinic uses a constraint induced therapy. This therapy focuses on stroke patients with limited function in a limb. The patient's good limb is constrained and the patient is directed through physical tasks of increasing difficulty to induce recovery of neural networks.

The American Stroke Association published an article in 2005 by Sawaki et al. on the possible use of SS to supplement UDP therapies. They suspected that because of the importance of somatosensory information in movement, that enhancing sensory processing through SS could also improve UDP. Their experiment had two experimental groups; both groups were directed to complete voluntary movements with their thumb, and one group underwent 20 minutes of SS before the directed thumb movements. It was found that the paired participants had greater recovery of function.

=== Impact on cortical maps ===
Cortical maps are the maps in which parts of our brain, such as the somatosensory system, are described. The cortical maps in our brains do not so much relate to our senses so much as it relates to our sense of physical touch. It has been found that the use of intensive training methods can be used to enlarge cortical maps for patients recovering from a stroke. Studies with that use fMRI and PET scans have shown that the degree of activation increases in the motor cortex of patients undergoing intensive therapies. This provides a strong support to the idea that plastic changes in the brain are a mechanism by which recovery can occur.

=== Acupuncture and physiotherapy improving postural control ===
Patients suffering from hemiparetic stroke often lose their ability to stand upright and hold their posture on their own. Without the ability to control our posture, we lose the ability to move freely and voluntarily, which is necessary for activities of daily living (ADL). Studies have been conducted to see if sensory stimulation could improve functionality after a stroke occurs. The study compared two groups; a group undergoing standard physical therapy (group 1), and a group that was given sensory stimulation with acupuncture, physiotherapy, and ADL training (group 2). Both groups began the study within ten days of the initial stroke. Group 2 achieved stimulation via traditional Chinese acupuncture (10 needles), placed according to traditional Chinese acupuncture points and kept in place for 30 minutes. Alongside the manual stimulation, electric stimulation (2 to 5 Hz) was also given to four of the ten needles. The treatment continued for four to ten days, with an average of six and a half days. The twenty-one patients in group 2 had a mean age of 74.2 and the mean age of group 1 was 74.8. From the patients in group 2 which postural recordings could be made, 7 patients suffered from hemiparetic lesion on the left side and 10 had lesions on the right. Of the patients in group 1, 4 had lesion to the left side and 3 on the right. Upon testing, the subjects stood on a platform with their heels together and their arms crossed over their chests. The subjects were exposed to perturbations via vibratory stimulus on their calf muscles, which caused anteroposterior movement, or galvanic stimulation of the vestibular nerves, causing lateral movement. Three different tests were done, with patients eyes both open and closed. Results of the study found that there were major differences in group 1, the control group, and group 2, the treatment group. More patients of the treatment group than the control group were able to maintain a healthy stance during perturbations. As both groups were being treated for post stroke symptoms, it was thought that these perturbations would enhance their posture and motor movements naturally. Among the subjects who survived 2 or more years after hemiparetic stroke, the treatment group (group 2), withheld better postural control. Furthermore, patients who had any additional sensory stimulation were comparable acquired values approaching the normal for age-matched healthy subjects when postural control was measured. The sensory stimulation tests enhanced at least partial recovery of postural function for up to 2 years after the stroke and treatment. After testing, it was deduced that improved recovery after sensory stimulation can be accomplished by patients regaining near normal dynamics of human postural control. Postural control is one of the most important issues in rehabilitation of stroke, thus concluding that sensory stimulation obtained from this study may enhance the functional plasticity of the brain.

== Conclusion ==
Sensory stimulation therapy is a developing technique aimed at recovering sensory loss after strokes and restoring losses from ageing. It has not been proven that sensory stimulation therapy can actually improve brain plasticity, nor cognitive function. The paradigm of brain plasticity marked a fundamental change in the way that the brain is understood, and considered for future therapies. SS takes advantage of this paradigm and the senses are presented with simple stimulation to cause changes inside the brain. In this particular situation a section of skin is stimulated either through electrical or physical means. Signals are sent through the peripheral nervous system to the somatosensory cortex. These signals are then the impetus for changes inside the brain. It has been shown that the adjustment of frequency in this technique can be used to induce either Long Term Potentiation or Long Term Depression. In the case of LTP as much as 30 years of sensory loss has been shown to be recoverable in relatively short time periods. SS has been paired with Use Dependant Plasticity training systems and it has been shown that enhanced recovery is produced from the combination. One of the striking advantages of this technique is that it is not necessary for the participant to pay attention to the stimulus in order to gain benefit from the therapy. This technique opens many interesting doors for future therapies. A potential challenge for this technique is that there is little transfer of gains from one section of skin to another.

Many studies have been conducted, most with some kind of positive conclusion however, further studies need to be conducted sensory stimulation in dementia in order to prove or disprove any theories.

== See also ==
- Multisensory integration
- Sensory processing disorder
- Sensory integration therapy
