= Neurogenesis hypothesis of depression =

Theory of depression

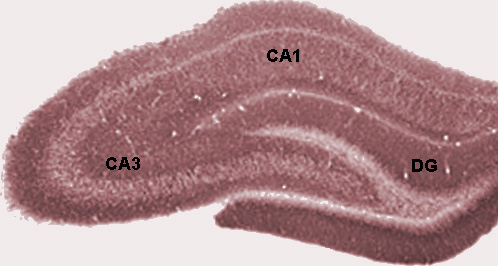
In humans, adult neurogenesis occurs in the subgranular zone of the dentate gyrus in the hippocampus (marked by 'DG' in the image)

Adult neurogenesis is the process by which functional, mature neurons are produced from neural stem cells (NSCs) in the adult brain. In most mammals, including humans, it only occurs in the subgranular zone of the hippocampus, and in the olfactory bulb. The neurogenesis hypothesis of depression proposes that major depressive disorder is caused, at least partly, by impaired neurogenesis in the subgranular zone of the hippocampus.

== Overview ==
Hippocampal neurogenesis

In the subgranular zone in the dentate gyrus of the hippocampus, NSCs differentiate into granule cells. These new granule cells are implicated in memory formation and learning. The number of granule cells generated in the dentate gyrus each month is approximately 6% of the total population of dentate gyrus neurons. The magnitude of this continuous production of new neurons indicates that they have an important role in hippocampal function.

Significance of hippocampus reduction

“Patients with depression had a statistically significant 19% smaller left hippocampal volume than comparison subjects, without smaller volumes of comparison regions (amygdala, caudate, frontal lobe, and temporal lobe) or whole brain volume. The findings were significant after brain size, alcohol exposure, age, and education were controlled for” (Bremner et al., 2000). The hippocampus serves an important role in memory and mood regulation, which is why the hippocampus reduction is a crucial factor to understanding the pathophysiology of depression. With further research, the hippcampus can also be connected to stress regulation, neuroplasticity, and executive function that correlate to the symptoms of major depressive disorder.

Inadequacy of the monoamine hypothesis of depression

While depression is a complex condition with many factors involved, it is commonly attributed to an imbalance of several key monoamine neurotransmitters, including serotonin, dopamine and norepinephrine. This monoamine hypothesis of depression is popular because of the simplicity of the explanation. However, the hypothesis is incomplete, as several lines of evidence suggests that depression is more than just a monoamine imbalance. For example, antidepressants usually take several weeks to reduce a patient's depressive symptoms, which is inconsistent with the finding that monoamine levels are affected within hours of using antidepressants. This suggests that antidepressants need to affect other biological systems, apart from monoamines, in order to reduce depressive symptoms.

Relationship between neurogenesis and depression

Stress has been reported to impair many aspects of hippocampal neurogenesis, including:

- Proliferation rate of neural progenitor cells
- Survival of neuroblasts and immature neurons
- Growth and development of new neuron

The neurogenesis hypothesis of depression posits that:

- Stressful experiences have a negative effect on the process of neurogenesis in the subgranular zone of the dentate gyrus.
- Alternations in the rate of neurogenesis play a fundamental role in the pathology and treatment of major depression.

== Experimental evidence ==
The neurogenesis hypothesis of depression gained popularity due to the large number of correlative studies which indicate a relationship between impaired hippocampal neurogenesis and depression. For example, reduced hippocampal volume is associated with depression, which impaired neurogenesis may contribute to.

Conflicting evidence

Studies with rats demonstrated that the administration of antidepressants increases hippocampal neurogenesis. Furthermore, studies with non-human primates found that stress, which is a predisposing factor to depression in humans, impairs hippocampal neurogenesis.

However, other studies have demonstrated that neuronal ablation does not always impair neurogenesis in laboratory animals. Furthermore, it was found that stress does not necessarily impair neurogenesis in laboratory animals. Furthermore, some of the effects of antidepressants are neurogenesis-independent.

Regarding these conflicting findings, Hanson et al., (2011) has suggested that neurogenesis in the adult dentate gyrus “can be regulated by stress and antidepressants under certain as-yet-undefined conditions”.

Lack of human studies

As it is not currently possible to track neurogenesis in humans in real-time, most studies have relied on animal models of depressive behaviours resulting from impaired neurogenesis.

== See also ==
- Neurotrophic hypothesis of depression
- Neuroplasticity
- Neurotrophic factors
