= Inferior frontal junction =

Area of the cerebral cortex

Details
- Function: Working memory, attention, neural activity

The inferior frontal junction area (IFJ) is an area of the brain located at the junction of the inferior frontal sulcus and the inferior precentral sulcus. It is involved in working memory and attention functions and has been shown as an important control region orchestrating neural activity elsewhere in the brain.
