= Rs6265 =

Single nucleotide polymorphism in human BDNF gene

SNP: rs6265
- Name(s): Val66Met, V66M, G196A
- Gene: BDNF
- Chromosome: 11

External databases
- Ensembl: Human SNPView
- dbSNP: 6265
- HapMap: 6265
- SNPedia: 6265
- AlzGene: Meta-analysis; Overview
- SzGene: Meta-analysis; Overview
- PDGene: Meta-analysis; Overview

Rs6265, also called Val66Met or G196A, is a gene variation, a single nucleotide polymorphism (SNP) in the BDNF gene that codes for brain-derived neurotrophic factor.

Well over a hundred research studies have examined the polymorphism.

== Association with neuropsychiatric disorders ==
Numerous studies have examined the role of this polymorphism in risk of neuropsychiatric disorders, including (but not limited to) schizophrenia and depression. It is generally thought that some variants of the polymorphism lead to memory impairment and susceptibility to neuropsychiatric disorders, and a 2007 meta-analysis of case-control studies found a relationship between the SNP and substance-related disorders, eating disorders, and schizophrenia. Another 2007 meta-analysis could, however, find no association between the SNP and schizophrenia or bipolar disorder. Meta-analyses of Alzheimer's disease and Parkinson's disease also indicate that the SNP has little or no association with these diseases. Also inconsistencies in association studies with depression have been noted.

The reason for these inconsistent results have been suggested to stem from several sources, with one recent review arguing that statistical artefact, sampling bias, population stratification and uncontrolled gene-environment interactions are likely to underscore this effect. These same authors recently published a report which found that transgenic mice engineered to express human BDNF as well as carry the Val66Met permutation are selectively sensitive to the glucocorticoid stress hormone corticosterone (rodent equivalent of cortisol), which in turn primes the fear circuitry and hippocampus-dependent memory function of Met/Met homozygous mice. As hippocampal function is a core component of several psychiatric conditions, and stress is a non-specific but substantial risk factor for affective, anxiety, eating and psychotic disorders, Notaras et al. argue that "there is a long-term effect of glucocorticoids in 66Met carriers that potentiates the fear circuitry into adulthood, which may increase susceptibility to trauma, events with negative emotional valence and related psychopathology". This interpretation is consistent with a suggested role of BDNF and the Val66Met polymorphism in post-traumatic stress disorder, where it has been shown that 66Met variant perturbs extinction learning in both man and mouse. The Val66Met polymorphism alters vulnerability to stress in mice and humans, which likely contributes to PTSD risk.

In treatment response studies val/val homozygotes may respond better than met allele carriers with drug resistant depression treated with repetitive transcranial magnetic stimulation.

== Subject variables in healthy humans ==
One study has reported that met/met carriers tend to have lower body mass index compared to the two other genotypes. Another study showed that subjects with the val/val genotype had higher mean intelligence. The same study found no association with personality traits as measured with the Tridimensional Personality Questionnaire. Also a Polish 2007 study observed no significant relationship between the polymorphism and personality in healthy females. A German 2005 study could though find an association with personality traits measured with NEO-Five Factor Inventory, with val/val subjects scoring higher on anxiety and neuroticism dimensions. Large studies and a meta-analysis inclusive of over 15,000 subjects, however, found no association between the Val66Met and Neuroticism.

== Other studies ==
A study in transgenic mice has found that met/met mice exhibits increased anxiety-related behaviors.
