= Epidemiology of metabolic syndrome =

Global overview of the current trends and distribution of metabolic syndrome

This article provides a global overview of the current trends and distribution of metabolic syndrome. Metabolic syndrome (also known as the cardiometabolic syndrome) refers to a cluster of related risk factors for cardiovascular disease that includes abdominal obesity, diabetes, hypertension, and elevated cholesterol.

Data from the World Health Organization suggests 65% of the world's population live in countries where being overweight or obese kills more people than being underweight. The WHO defines "overweight" as a BMI greater than or equal to 25, and "obesity" as a BMI greater than or equal to 30. Both overweight and obesity are major risk factors for cardiovascular diseases, specifically heart disease and stroke, and diabetes.

The International Diabetes Federation reports that as of 2011, 366 million people have diabetes; this number is projected to increase to over half a billion (estimated 552 million) by 2030. 80 percent of people with diabetes live in developing countries and in 2011, diabetes caused 4.6 million deaths and approximately 78,000 children were diagnosed with type 1 diabetes.

== Background ==
Different definitions of the cardiometabolic syndrome have been proposed by different public health organizations, but recently the International Diabetes Federation (IDF), the National Heart, Lung, and Blood Institute (NHLBI), the American Heart Association (AHA), and others proposed a definition for diagnosing the cardiometabolic syndrome that includes the presence of three out of the following five risk factors:

- Fasting plasma glucose greater than or equal to 100 mg/dL, or undergoing drug treatment for elevated glucose
- HDL cholesterol less than 40 mg/dL in men or less than 50 mg/dL in women, or undergoing drug treatment for reduced HDL cholesterol
- Triglycerides greater than or equal to 150 mg/dL, or undergoing drug treatment for elevated triglycerides
- Waist circumference greater than or equal to 102 cm (40 in) in men or 88 cm (35 in) in women (in the United States)
- Blood pressure greater than or equal to 130 mm Hg systolic or 85 mm Hg diastolic, or undergoing drug treatment for hypertension

Approximately 40–46 percent of the world's adult population has the cluster of risk factors that is metabolic syndrome. In 2000, approximately 32% of U.S. adults had the metabolic syndrome. In more recent years that figure has climbed to 34%.

People with the cardiometabolic syndrome have twice the likelihood of developing and dying from cardiovascular disease, and more than seven times the risk of developing diabetes, compared to those with no cardiometabolic risk factors.

== Africa ==
Diabetes now affects over 14 million people in the central and southern regions of Africa; this number is expected to increase to 28 million people by 2030, according to the IDF Africa. The NGO Project Hope cites lifestyle changes as the primary cause of the increase of diabetes, specifically type 2 diabetes, which seems to correspond with a growing waist line. Lack of physical activity, increased consumption of processed food and unmanaged portion sizes all contribute to the rise of diabetes – a major component of cardiometabolic risk. In countries where there are food crises, "much of the foods donated from the international community are calorie-dense foods", according to Project Hope's Senior Advisor, Paul Madden. Nutrition education is essential to prevent type 2 diabetes from consuming the continent. The NGO also suggests that in some villages, 70 to 80 percent of the people may not even be aware that they are living with the disease.

Studies published in the Indian Journal of Endocrinology and Metabolism focused on the prevalence of metabolic syndrome and its components in different African populations using various criteria. Reports from Lagos, Nigeria, for instance, showed the prevalence rate of metabolic syndrome as high as over 80% among diabetic patients. The current trend of rising metabolic syndrome in African populations is largely and generally attributed to "adoption of western lifestyle which is characterized by reduced physical activity, substitution of the traditional African diet rich in fruits, and vegetables for the more energy-laden foods".

== Europe ==
Currently, more than 55 million people in Europe have been diagnosed with diabetes, according to the IDF; by 2030 this total will rise to 64 million people. Roughly 8.4% of adults are affected by this disease, which caused 622,114 deaths in the region this year. 33 IDF studies have also concluded that Europe has the highest number of children with type 1 diabetes.

The European Global Cardiometabolic Risk Profile in Patients with Hypertension Disease (GOOD) survey investigated the cardiometabolic risk profile in adult patients with hypertension across 289 locations in four European regions. Across the Northwest, Mediterranean, Atlantic European Mainland and Central Europe zones, demographic, lifestyle, clinical and laboratory data were collected from eligible patients during one clinic visit. In Central Europe 44% of the participants had type 2 diabetes compared with 33% in the Atlantic European Mainland, and 26% in the Northwest and the Mediterranean regions. The study revealed a prevalence of metabolic syndrome affected 68% of Central Europe, 60% of the Atlantic European Mainland, 52% of the Mediterranean regions and 50% of Northwest Europe. Fasting blood glucose, total cholesterol and triglyceride levels were all highest in Central Europe compared with the other three regions. Roughly 80% of the Atlantic European Mainland patients had uncontrolled blood pressure, whereas the other three regions tallied approximately 70-71%. Compared to the Northwest, Mediterranean, and Central Europe regions, declared alcohol consumption was also recorded the highest in the Atlantic European Mainland; exercise was lowest in Central Europe.

The GOOD survey recorded cases of congestive heart failure, left ventricular hypertrophy, coronary artery disease and stable/unstable angina were highest in Central Europe compared with the other regions. Family history of premature stroke or myocardial infarction, stroke, coronary revascularization and transient ischaemic attacks had the highest prevalence in the Atlantic European Mainland. Statistical conclusions indicate that hypertensive patients across Europe exhibit multiple cardiometabolic risk factors, with greater predominance in Central Europe and the Atlantic European Mainland compared with Northwest and Mediterranean regions.

== Middle East and North Africa ==
The International Diabetes Federation reports more than 34.2 million people in the Middle East and North Africa have diabetes; this number will rise to 59.7 million by the year 2030 unless counteractive measures are introduced. In 2012, diabetes caused 356,586 deaths in this region, a zone with the highest prevalence of diabetes in adults (11%) in the world.

Turkey reported a prevalence of 33.9% for metabolic syndrome (MS), with a higher prevalence in women (39.6%) than in men (28%). The survey included random samples from both urban and rural populations in seven geographical regions of Turkey. More than one-third (35.08%) of the participants were obese. Of those tested, 13.66% had hypertension, while those with diabetes mellitus (DM) and MS were 4.16% and 17.91%, respectively. The frequency of hypertension, MS and obesity were higher in females than males; however, DM was higher in males than females. According to the IDF, metabolic syndrome was prevalent in 16.1% of the Saudi Arabian population. In Tunisia, metabolic syndrome incidence was 45.5% based on the IDF criteria. 37.4% of Iranians aging from 25 to 64, living in both urban and rural areas of all 30 provinces in Iran, had MS (based on the IDF definition); results based on the Adult Treatment Panel III (ATPIII)/American Heart Association (AHA)/National Heart, Lung, and Blood Institute (NHLBI) standards suggest 41.6% of the same group of Iranians has metabolic syndrome. MS is estimated to affect more than 11 million Iranians.

== North America and the Caribbean ==
Current IDF data proposes more than 38.4 million people in North American and the Caribbean have diabetes and projects this number will increase to 51.2 million by 2030. In 2012, 11% of (or approximately 4.2 million) adults in the NAC Region endured the disease; this year, diabetes was responsible for 287,020 deaths in North America.

The National Center for Biotechnological Information notes the incidence of the metabolic syndrome among Caribbean-born persons in the U. S. Virgin Islands is comparable to that among the population on the mainland of the United States. The groups involved in the study were Hispanic white, Hispanic black, non-Hispanic black born in the U.S. Virgin Islands, and non-Hispanic black born elsewhere in the Caribbean. Hispanic ethnicity was independently associated with an increased risk of having the metabolic syndrome, high triglycerides, and low high density lipoprotein cholesterol levels. Among Caribbean-born persons living in the U.S. Virgin Islands, those who are Hispanic blacks may have a greater risk of cardiovascular disease than do other groups.

=== United States ===
Approximately 27 million Americans, or nearly 11% of the population, have diabetes, according to the American Diabetes Association and the Centers for Disease Control and Prevention. By 2050, the prevalence of diabetes could increase to as much as 33% of the population, largely due to the aging of the population and to people with diabetes living longer. Approximately 1.9 million new cases of diabetes are diagnosed each year. The disease was the seventh leading cause of death in 2007, directly claiming more than 71,000 lives and contributing to approximately 160,000 additional deaths. Patients with diabetes are two to four times more likely than those without it to die from cardiovascular disease, and diabetes is an important cause of blindness, kidney disease, and lower-extremity amputations.

An additional 79 million Americans have prediabetes. Individuals with prediabetes have blood glucose levels that are higher than normal but not high enough to be classified as diabetes. Without intervention, most people with prediabetes will develop diabetes within ten years. In addition, studies have shown that these individuals are at increased risk for cardiovascular disease, including a heart attack or stroke. Individuals with prediabetes are also likely to have additional cardiovascular risk factors such as elevated cholesterol and high blood pressure.

Diabetes and prediabetes are strongly linked to obesity and overweight. Nearly 50% of people with diabetes are obese, and 90% are overweight. A chief risk factor for prediabetes is excess abdominal fat. Obesity increases one's risk for a variety of other medical problems, including hypertension, stroke, other forms of cardiovascular disease, arthritis, and several forms of cancer. Obese individuals are at twice the risk of dying from any cause than normal-weight individuals. The prevalence of obesity and overweight have risen to epidemic proportions in the United States, where 67% of adults are overweight and, of these, approximately half are obese.

The prevalence of hypertension, another cardiometabolic syndrome component, has been increasing for the last decade. In 1994, 24% of U.S. adults had hypertension. Today, that figure has risen to 29%, according to data from the National Health and Nutrition Examination Survey. In addition, nearly 30% of U.S. adults have prehypertension. Hypertension increases one's risk of having a stroke, developing end-stage renal disease, and dying from cardiovascular disease. In recent years, hypertension has directly claimed more than 61,000 U.S. lives and has contributed to approximately 347,000 deaths each year.

Of the components of the cardiometabolic syndrome, only the prevalence of dyslipidemia has declined in the United States. Between 1999 and 2010, the percentage of U.S. adults with high total cholesterol declined from approximately 18% to 13%. However, according to the American Heart Association, nearly half of U.S. adults today (44%) are still at increased risk for atherosclerotic disease because their levels of total cholesterol are elevated (200 mg/dL or higher). Of these 98.8 million individuals with elevated cholesterol, 33.6 million have high cholesterol (240 mg/dL or above), and 71.3 million have low-density lipoprotein (LDL) cholesterol levels of 130 mg/dL or higher. In addition, approximately 19% of U.S. adults have low levels of high-density lipoprotein (HDL) cholesterol, and one-third have elevated triglycerides. Finally, dyslipidemia affects the vast majority (up to 97%) of individuals with diabetes and contributes to their elevated risk for cardiovascular disease.

=== United States children ===
According to estimates from the American Heart Association, more than 9% of U.S. children and adolescents aged 12–19, or nearly three million individuals, have the metabolic syndrome. Among overweight and obese adolescents, this prevalence rate rises to 44%. Two-thirds of adolescents have at least one metabolic abnormality.

Preliminary prospective studies report that children and adolescents with the metabolic syndrome are at high risk of developing cardiovascular disease and diabetes as adults. One 25-year prospective study found that, compared with children without the syndrome, those with the metabolic syndrome are 14 times more likely to have cardiovascular disease and 11 times more likely to develop diabetes when they reach adulthood. Cardiometabolic risk among children and adolescents is fueled by the rising prevalence of obesity in this age group. From 1980 to 2008, rates of obesity have increased from 5% to 10% among preschool children aged 2–5. During the same time period, obesity increased from 6.5% to nearly 20% among 6–11-year-olds and from 5% to 18% among adolescents aged 12–19. Hypertension among children and adolescents has increased by 1% since 1999 and is estimated to affect 3.6% of those aged 3–18. This increase is attributed to the rising number of overweight and obese children. The prevalence of lipid abnormalities among children and adolescents is also tied to obesity and overweight. Approximately 14% of normal-weight youths aged 12–19 have lipid abnormalities. That figure rises to 22% of overweight youths and nearly 43% of obese youths.

Obesity is also tied to the rise of type 2 diabetes among U.S. children. Until recently, diabetes in children was typically assumed to be type 1, formerly known as juvenile-onset diabetes. However, according to the Centers for Disease Control and Prevention, recent clinical evidence indicates that the prevalence of type 2 diabetes, formerly known as adult-onset diabetes, is increasing among American children and adolescents. This increase is most notable among Blacks, Asian/Pacific Islanders, Hispanics, and American Indians. Children who develop type 2 diabetes are typically overweight or obese. "Type 2 diabetes in children and adolescents already appears to be a sizable and growing problem," the CDC says. "Better physician awareness and monitoring of the disease's magnitude will be necessary."

=== Native Americans (American Indians) ===
The National Cholesterol Education Program compiled and presented data from the Indian Health Service that indicates increasing mortality rates due to cardiovascular disease vary among American Indian communities. The significant independent predictors of CVD in Native American women were diabetes, age, obesity, LDL, albuminuria, triglycerides, and hypertension. In men the significant predictors of CVD were diabetes, age, LDL, albuminuria, and hypertension. Unlike other ethnic groups, Native Americans appear to have an increasing frequency of coronary heart disease, possibly related to the high and increasing prevalence of diabetes in these communities. Although total and LDL-cholesterol levels are lower than the U.S. average, importance of LDL cholesterol as a contributor to CHD in this group should not be underestimated. Moreover, because of the high frequency of type 2 diabetes, many Native Americans will have an even lower LDL goal. The evidence for differences in baseline risk between Native American and white populations is not strong enough to justify separate guidelines for Native American populations.

== South and Central America ==
The IDF reports 9.2% of adults in the South and Central America (SACA) have diabetes and 12.3% of deaths in adults in the SACA Region can be attributed to the disease. More than 26.4 million people in the SACA Region have diabetes; by 2030 this will rise to 39.9 million. Approximately 236,328 disease related fatalities occurred in the SACA Region in 2012.

The Latin American populations exhibit a high prevalence of abdominal obesity and metabolic syndrome, similar or even higher than developed countries. It is attributed to changes in their lifestyle, migration from rural to urban areas and a higher susceptibility to accumulate abdominal fat and develop more insulin resistance compared to other ethnically different populations. Some genetic factors and metabolic adaptations during fetal life can be claimed as etiological factors of this condition.

Although cardiovascular disease (CVD) is the leading cause of death and disability in the majority of the countries in Latin America, few data about regional differences on this topic has emerged. Developing countries have scarce epidemiological data on cardiovascular (CV) risk factor prevalence, which only allows for limited control and treatment options. The load of the CV risk factors, especially hypertension, remains uncertain.

== South-East Asia ==
A 2012 IDF South-East Asia report states one fifth of all adults living with diabetes live in South East Asia and 8.7% of adults in the region endure the disease, according to the International Diabetes Federation. As of this 2012, 70.3 million people in the SEA Region have diabetes; by 2030 this will rise to 120.9 million diagnoses.

There has been special interest in South Asians because they have been reported to have very high frequency rates of coronary heart disease at younger ages in the absence of traditional risk factors. The higher CHD risk in this population may be related in part to a higher prevalence of insulin resistance, the metabolic syndrome, and diabetes. Lipoprotein levels have also been reported to be elevated, elevating the importance of initiating remedies to reduce cholesterol and other CHD risk factors in this group with South Asian Indian ancestry. A growing body of evidence indicates that South Asians are at high baseline risk for CHD, compared to American whites; they are particularly at risk for the metabolic syndrome and type 2 diabetes. Also, increased emphasis should be given to life habit changes to mitigate the metabolic syndrome in this population. All other data reflects cholesterol management guidelines should remain the same for the SEA population as well as for other population groups.

== Western Pacific ==
The IDF Western pacific reports more people with diabetes live in the Western Pacific than any other region in the world. Approximately 132.2 million people in the WP Region have diabetes; if proper precautions are not utilized, this number is projected to escalate to 187.9 million people by 2030. 44 8% of all Western Pacific adults have diabetes and in 2012, the illness caused 1.7 million deaths in the Western Pacific.

There is limited information on the risks and benefits of lipid management for reduction of coronary heart disease (CHD) and cardiovascular disease (CVD) in this population. In the Honolulu Heart Program report, CHD and CVD mortality rates are lower than in the general U.S. population. However, the evidence for differences between Pacific Islander and general U.S. populations is not strong enough to justify the creating of separate guidelines.
