= Brain-derived neurotrophic factor =

Protein found in humans

BDNF
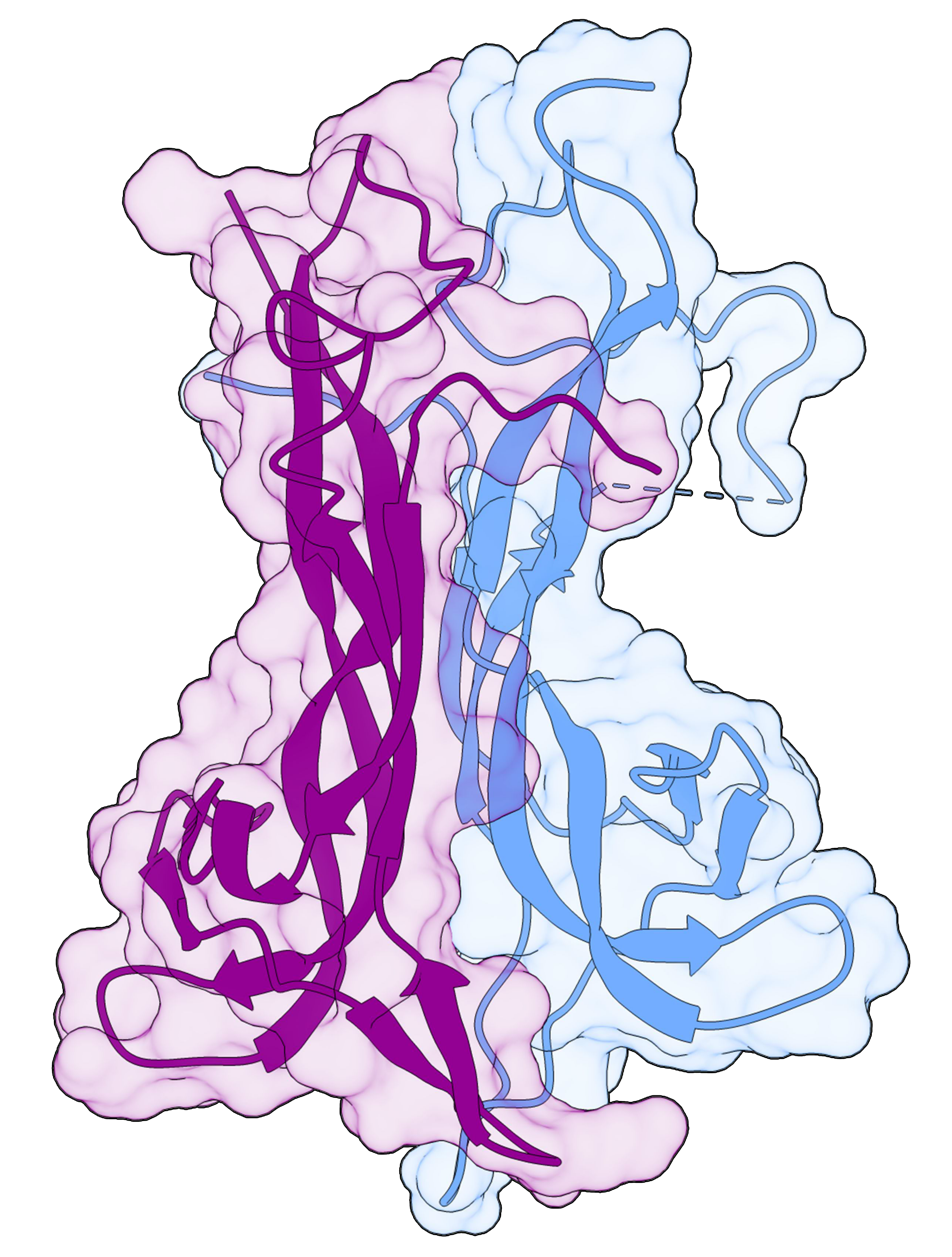

Identifiers
- Aliases: BDNF, brain-derived neurotrophic factor, ANON2, BULN2, Brain-derived neurotrophic factor, brain derived neurotrophic factor
- External IDs: OMIM: 113505; MGI: 88145; GeneCards: BDNF
Available structures
PDB	Ortholog search: PDBe RCSB
PDB	List of PDB id codes 1BND, 1B8M

Gene location (Human)
Chr.	Chromosome 11 (human)
Band	11p14.1	Start	27,654,893 bp
Band	11p14.1	End	27,722,058 bp

Gene location (Mouse)
Chr.	Chromosome 2 (mouse)
Band	2 E3|2 56.63 cM	Start	109,505,045 bp
Band	2 E3|2 56.63 cM	End	109,557,352 bp
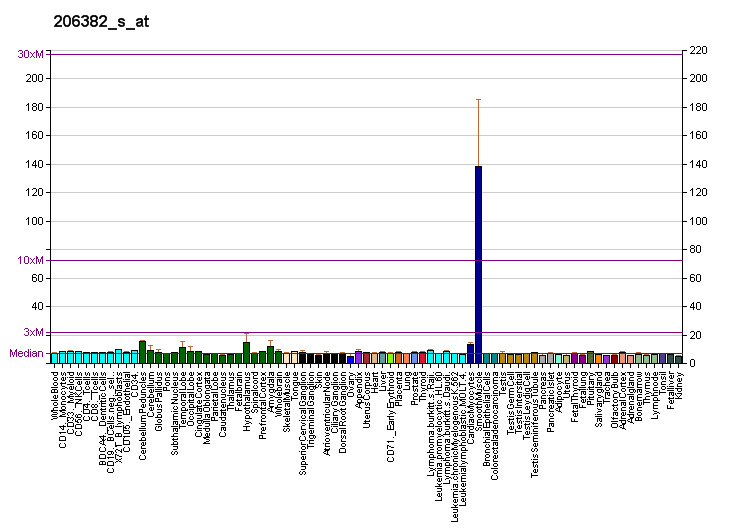
RNA expression pattern
Bgee	Human / Mouse (ortholog); Top expressed in: saphenous vein; pons; oocyte; vena cava; secondary oocyte; stromal cell of endometrium; corpus epididymis; testicle; buccal mucosa cell; apex of heart / Top expressed in: lumbar spinal ganglion; CA3 field; utricle; hippocampus proper; perirhinal cortex; dentate gyrus; entorhinal cortex; cingulate gyrus; amygdala; interventricular septum; More reference expression data
BioGPS	More reference expression data
Gene ontology
Molecular function	signaling receptor binding; neurotrophin TRKB receptor binding; growth factor activity; protein binding
Cellular component	cytoplasm; perinuclear region of cytoplasm; mitochondrion; nuclear speck; cytoplasmic vesicle; extracellular region; extracellular space; synaptic vesicle; axon; dendrite
Biological process	brain-derived neurotrophic factor receptor signaling pathway; negative regulation of neuron apoptotic process; synapse assembly; cell-cell signaling; positive regulation of brain-derived neurotrophic factor receptor signaling pathway; collateral sprouting; positive regulation of synapse assembly; positive regulation of collateral sprouting; nervous system development; axon guidance; negative regulation of myotube differentiation; positive regulation of receptor binding; regulation of protein localization to cell surface; regulation of signaling receptor activity; activation of phospholipase C activity; neurotrophin TRK receptor signaling pathway; positive regulation of non-membrane spanning protein tyrosine kinase activity; transmembrane receptor protein tyrosine kinase signaling pathway; peripheral nervous system development; memory; nerve development; nerve growth factor signaling pathway; regulation of neuron differentiation; neuron projection morphogenesis; modulation of chemical synaptic transmission; positive regulation of neuron projection development; negative regulation of apoptotic signaling pathway
Sources:Amigo / QuickGO
Orthologs
Databases	NCBI: entry; OMA: entry
Species	Human	Mouse
Entrez	627	12064
Ensembl	ENSG00000176697	ENSMUSG00000048482
UniProt	P23560	P21237
RefSeq (mRNA)	NM_001143805; NM_001143806; NM_001143807; NM_001143808; NM_001143809 NM_001143810; NM_001143811; NM_001143812; NM_001143813; NM_001143814; NM_001143815; NM_001143816; NM_001709; NM_170731; NM_170732; NM_170733; NM_170734; NM_170735	NM_001048139; NM_001048141; NM_001048142; NM_007540; NM_001285416 NM_001285417; NM_001285418; NM_001285419; NM_001285420; NM_001285421; NM_001285422; NM_001316310
RefSeq (protein)	NP_001137277; NP_001137278; NP_001137279; NP_001137280; NP_001137281 NP_001137282; NP_001137283; NP_001137284; NP_001137285; NP_001137286; NP_001137288; NP_001700; NP_733927; NP_733928; NP_733929; NP_733930; NP_733931	NP_001041604; NP_001041606; NP_001041607; NP_001272345; NP_001272346 NP_001272347; NP_001272348; NP_001272349; NP_001272350; NP_001272351; NP_001303239; NP_031566
Location (UCSC)	Chr 11: 27.65 – 27.72 Mb	Chr 2: 109.51 – 109.56 Mb
PubMed search
- Wikidata
View/Edit Human	View/Edit Mouse

Brain-derived neurotrophic factor (Bdnf), or abrineurin, is a protein that, in humans, is encoded by the BDNF gene. BDNF is a member of the neurotrophin family of growth factors, which are related to the canonical nerve growth factor (NGF), a family which also includes NT-3 and NT-4/NT-5. Neurotrophic factors are found in the brain and the periphery. BDNF was first isolated from a pig brain in 1982 by Yves-Alain Barde and Hans Thoenen.

BDNF activates the TrkB tyrosine kinase receptor.

== Function ==
BDNF acts on certain neurons of the central nervous system and the peripheral nervous system expressing TrkB, helping to support survival of existing neurons, and encouraging growth and differentiation of new neurons and synapses. In the brain it is active in the hippocampus, cortex, and basal forebrain—areas vital to learning, memory, and higher thinking. BDNF is also expressed in the retina, kidneys, prostate, motor neurons, and skeletal muscle, and is also found in saliva.

BDNF itself is important for long-term memory. Although the vast majority of neurons in the mammalian brain are formed prenatally, parts of the adult brain retain the ability to grow new neurons from neural stem cells in a process known as neurogenesis. Neurotrophins are proteins that help to stimulate and control neurogenesis, BDNF being one of the most active. Mice born without the ability to make BDNF have developmental defects in the brain and sensory nervous system, and usually die soon after birth, suggesting that BDNF plays an important role in normal neural development. Other important neurotrophins structurally related to BDNF include NT-3, NT-4, and NGF.

BDNF is made in the endoplasmic reticulum and secreted from dense-core vesicles. It binds carboxypeptidase E (CPE), and disruption of this binding has been proposed to cause the loss of sorting BDNF into dense-core vesicles. The phenotype for BDNF knockout mice can be severe, including postnatal lethality. Other traits include sensory neuron losses that affect coordination, balance, hearing, taste, and breathing. Knockout mice also exhibit cerebellar abnormalities and an increase in the number of sympathetic neurons.

Certain types of physical exercise have been shown to markedly (threefold) increase BDNF synthesis in the human brain, a phenomenon which is partly responsible for exercise-induced neurogenesis and improvements in cognitive function. Niacin appears to upregulate BDNF and tropomyosin receptor kinase B (TrkB) expression as well. Sleep also influences BDNF expression: short sleep duration in humans has been associated with reduced BDNF levels, and BDNF signaling in turn appears to play a role in the regulation of REM sleep.

== Mechanism of action ==
BDNF binds at least two receptors on the surface of cells that are capable of responding to this growth factor, TrkB (pronounced "Track B") and the LNGFR (for low-affinity nerve growth factor receptor, also known as p75). It may also modulate the activity of various neurotransmitter receptors, including the Alpha-7 nicotinic receptor. BDNF has also been shown to interact with the reelin signaling chain. The expression of reelin by Cajal–Retzius cells goes down during development under the influence of BDNF. The latter also decreases reelin expression in neuronal culture.

=== TrkB ===
The TrkB receptor is encoded by the NTRK2 gene and is member of a receptor family of tyrosine kinases that includes TrkA and TrkC. TrkB autophosphorylation is dependent upon its ligand-specific association with BDNF, a widely expressed activity-dependent neurotrophic factor that regulates plasticity and is dysregulated following hypoxic injury. The activation of the BDNF-TrkB pathway is important in the development of short-term memory and the growth of neurons.

=== LNGFR ===
The role of the other BDNF receptor, p75, is less clear. While the TrkB receptor interacts with BDNF in a ligand-specific manner, all neurotrophins can interact with the p75 receptor. When the p75 receptor is activated, it leads to activation of NFkB receptor. Thus, neurotrophic signaling may trigger apoptosis rather than survival pathways in cells expressing the p75 receptor in the absence of Trk receptors. Recent studies have revealed a truncated isoform of the TrkB receptor (t-TrkB) may act as a dominant negative to the p75 neurotrophin receptor, inhibiting the activity of p75, and preventing BDNF-mediated cell death.

== Expression ==
The BDNF protein is encoded by a gene that is also called BDNF, found in humans on chromosome 11. Structurally, BDNF transcription is controlled by eight different promoters, each leading to different transcripts containing one of eight untranslated 5' exons (I to VIII) spliced to the 3' encoding exon. Promoter IV activity, leading to the translation of exon IV-containing mRNA, is strongly stimulated by calcium and is primarily under the control of a Cre regulatory component, suggesting a putative role for the transcription factor CREB and the source of BDNF's activity-dependent effects . There are multiple mechanisms through neuronal activity that can increase BDNF exon IV specific expression. Stimulus-mediated neuronal excitation can lead to NMDA receptor activation, triggering a calcium influx. Through a protein signaling cascade requiring Erk, CaM KII/IV, PI3K, and PLC, NMDA receptor activation is capable of triggering BDNF exon IV transcription. BDNF exon IV expression also seems capable of further stimulating its own expression through TrkB activation. BDNF is released from the post-synaptic membrane in an activity-dependent manner, allowing it to act on local TrkB receptors and mediate effects that can lead to signaling cascades also involving Erk and CaM KII/IV. Both of these pathways probably involve calcium-mediated phosphorylation of CREB at Ser133, thus allowing it to interact with BDNF's Cre regulatory domain and upregulate transcription. However, NMDA-mediated receptor signaling is probably necessary to trigger the upregulation of BDNF exon IV expression because normally CREB interaction with CRE and the subsequent translation of the BDNF transcript is blocked by of the basic helix–loop–helix transcription factor protein 2 (BHLHB2). NMDA receptor activation triggers the release of the regulatory inhibitor, allowing for BDNF exon IV upregulation to take place in response to the activity-initiated calcium influx. Activation of dopamine receptor D_{5} also promotes expression of BDNF in prefrontal cortex neurons.

== BDNF-AS ==
The genomic locus encoding BDNF is structurally complex and also encodes BDNF-antisense (BDNF-AS; also known as BDNFOS or ANTI-BDNF). BDNF-AS is a long non-coding RNA (lncRNA) transcribed from the opposite strand of the BDNF gene. This lncRNA was identified in 2005 through searches in expressed sequence tag (EST) databases and subsequent RT-PCR experiments. The gene encoding BDNF-AS is located on chromosome 11p14.1. BDNF mRNA and BDNF-AS share a common overlapping region and form double-stranded RNA (dsRNA) duplexes.

BDNF-AS regulates BDNF expression and can suppress BDNF mRNA. In the human neocortex, regions with increased activity and BDNF expression exhibit reduced BDNF-AS expression. Elevated BDNF-AS levels are associated with reduced BDNF expression and have been shown to promote neurotoxicity, increase apoptosis, and decrease cell viability. Conversely, inhibiting BDNF-AS upregulates BDNF mRNA, activates BDNF-mediated signaling pathways, increases BDNF protein levels, suppresses neuronal apoptosis, and promotes neuronal outgrowth and differentiation.

The BDNF-AS gene consists of 10 exons and a functional promoter upstream of exon 1. The BDNF-AS gene generates numerous distinct non-coding RNAs through alternative splicing. This diversity of spliced isoforms is a common feature of eukaryotic organisms, particularly in the nervous system. Notably, BDNF-AS is absent in rodents, although highly homologous sequences are present in the genomes of chimpanzees and rhesus monkeys, suggesting a primate/hominid evolutionary origin of BDNF-AS.

Variations in both the BDNF and BDNF-AS genes are important factors to consider, given their potential to alter BDNF function and contribute to multiple human phenotypes influencing disease susceptibility and treatment outcomes.

== Common SNPs in BDNF gene ==
BDNF has several known single nucleotide polymorphisms (SNP), including, but not limited to, rs6265, C270T, rs7103411, rs2030324, rs2203877, rs2049045 and rs7124442. rs6265 is the most studied SNP in the BDNF gene.

=== Val66Met ===
A common SNP in the BDNF gene is rs6265. This point mutation in the coding sequence, a guanine to adenine switch at position 196, results in an amino acid switch: valine to methionine exchange at codon 66, Val66Met, which is in the prodomain of BDNF. Val66Met is unique to humans.

The mutation interferes with normal translation and intracellular trafficking of BDNF mRNA, as it destabilizes the mRNA and renders it prone to degradation. The proteins resulting from mRNA that does get translated, are not trafficked and secreted normally, as the amino acid change occurs on the portion of the prodomain where sortilin binds; and sortilin is essential for normal trafficking.

The Val66Met mutation results in a reduction of hippocampal tissue and has since been reported in a high number of individuals with learning and memory disorders, anxiety disorders, major depression, and neurodegenerative diseases such as Alzheimer's and Parkinson's.

A meta-analysis indicates that the BDNF Val66Met variant is not associated with serum BDNF.

== Role in synaptic transmission ==
=== Glutamatergic signaling ===
Glutamate is the brain's major excitatory neurotransmitter and its release can trigger the depolarization of postsynaptic neurons. AMPA and NMDA receptors are two ionotropic glutamate receptors involved in glutamatergic neurotransmission and essential to learning and memory via long-term potentiation. While AMPA receptor activation leads to depolarization via sodium influx, NMDA receptor activation by rapid successive firing allows calcium influx in addition to sodium. The calcium influx triggered through NMDA receptors can lead to expression of BDNF, as well as other genes thought to be involved in LTP, dendritogenesis, and synaptic stabilization.

==== NMDA receptor activity ====
NMDA receptor activation is essential to producing the activity-dependent molecular changes involved in the formation of new memories. Following exposure to an enriched environment, BDNF and NR1 phosphorylation levels are upregulated simultaneously, probably because BDNF is capable of phosphorylating NR1 subunits, in addition to its many other effects. One of the primary ways BDNF can modulate NMDA receptor activity is through phosphorylation and activation of the NMDA receptor one subunit, particularly at the PKC Ser-897 site. The mechanism underlying this activity is dependent upon both ERK and PKC signaling pathways, each acting individually, and all NR1 phosphorylation activity is lost if the TrKB receptor is blocked. PI3 kinase and Akt are also essential in BDNF-induced potentiation of NMDA receptor function and inhibition of either molecule eliminated receptor BDNF can also increase NMDA receptor activity through phosphorylation of the NR2B subunit. BDNF signaling leads to the autophosphorylation of the intracellular domain of the TrkB receptor (ICD-TrkB). Upon autophosphorylation, Fyn associates with the pICD-TrkB through its Src homology domain 2 (SH2) and is phosphorylated at its Y416 site. Once activated, Fyn can bind to NR2B through its SH2 domain and mediate phosphorylation of its Tyr-1472 site. Similar studies have suggested Fyn is also capable of activating NR2A although this was not found in the hippocampus. Thus, BDNF can increase NMDA receptor activity through Fyn activation. This has been shown to be important for processes such as spatial memory in the hippocampus, demonstrating the therapeutic and functional relevance of BDNF-mediated NMDA receptor activation.

==== Synapse stability ====
In addition to mediating transient effects on NMDAR activation to promote memory-related molecular changes, BDNF should also initiate more stable effects that could be maintained in its absence and not depend on its expression for long term synaptic support. It was previously mentioned that AMPA receptor expression is essential to learning and memory formation, as these are the components of the synapse that will communicate regularly and maintain the synapse structure and function long after the initial activation of NMDA channels. BDNF is capable of increasing the mRNA expression of GluR1 and GluR2 through its interaction with the TrkB receptor and promoting the synaptic localization of GluR1 via PKC- and CaMKII-mediated Ser-831 phosphorylation. It also appears that BDNF is able to influence Gl1 activity through its effects on NMDA receptor activity. BDNF significantly enhanced the activation of GluR1 through phosphorylation of tyrosine830, an effect that was abolished in either the presence of a specific NR2B antagonist or a trk receptor tyrosine kinase inhibitor. Thus, it appears BDNF can upregulate the expression and synaptic localization of AMPA receptors, as well as enhance their activity through its postsynaptic interactions with the NR2B subunit. Further, BDNF can regulate the nanoscale architecture of adhesion proteins such as Neogenin which are essential for spine enlargement and activity. This suggests BDNF is not only capable of initiating synapse formation through its effects on NMDA receptor activity, but it can also support the regular every-day signaling necessary for stable memory function. BDNF is also required for stabilizing actin polymerization in spines through triggering the activation of the WAVE regulatory complex.

=== GABAergic signaling ===
One mechanism through which BDNF appears to maintain elevated levels of neuronal excitation is through preventing GABAergic signaling activities. While glutamate is the brain's major excitatory neurotransmitter and phosphorylation normally activates receptors, GABA is the brain's primary inhibitory neurotransmitter and phosphorylation of GABA_{A} receptors tend to reduce their activity. Blockading BDNF signaling with a tyrosine kinase inhibitor or a PKC inhibitor in wild type mice produced significant reductions in spontaneous action potential frequencies that were mediated by an increase in the amplitude of GABAergic inhibitory postsynaptic currents (IPSC). Similar effects could be obtained in BDNF knockout mice, but these effects were reversed by local application of BDNF. This suggests BDNF increases excitatory synaptic signaling partly through the post-synaptic suppression of GABAergic signaling by activating PKC through its association with TrkB. Once activated, PKC can reduce the amplitude of IPSCs through to GABAA receptor phosphorylation and inhibition. In support of this putative mechanism, activation of PKCε leads to phosphorylation of N-ethylmaleimide-sensitive factor (NSF) at serine 460 and threonine 461, increasing its ATPase activity which downregulates GABAA receptor surface expression and subsequently attenuates inhibitory currents.

=== Synaptogenesis ===
BDNF also enhances synaptogenesis. Synaptogenesis is dependent upon the assembly of new synapses and the disassembly of old synapses by β-adducin. Adducins are membrane-skeletal proteins that cap the growing ends of actin filaments and promote their association with spectrin, another cytoskeletal protein, to create stable and integrated cytoskeletal networks. Actins have a variety of roles in synaptic functioning. In pre-synaptic neurons, actins are involved in synaptic vesicle recruitment and vesicle recovery following neurotransmitter release. In post-synaptic neurons they can influence dendritic spine formation and retraction as well as AMPA receptor insertion and removal. At their C-terminus, adducins possess a myristoylated alanine-rich C kinase substrate (MARCKS) domain which regulates their capping activity. BDNF can reduce capping activities by upregulating PKC, which can bind to the adducing MRCKS domain, inhibit capping activity, and promote synaptogenesis through dendritic spine growth and disassembly and other activities.

=== Dendritogenesis ===
Local interaction of BDNF with the TrkB receptor on a single dendritic segment is able to stimulate an increase in PSD-95 trafficking to other separate dendrites as well as to the synapses of locally stimulated neurons. PSD-95 localizes the actin-remodeling GTPases, Rac and Rho, to synapses through the binding of its PDZ domain to kalirin, increasing the number and size of spines. Thus, BDNF-induced trafficking of PSD-95 to dendrites stimulates actin remodeling and causes dendritic growth in response to BDNF.

== Neurogenesis ==
Laboratory studies indicate that BDNF may play a role in neurogenesis. BDNF can promote protective pathways and inhibit damaging pathways in the NSCs and NPCs that contribute to the brain's neurogenic response by enhancing cell survival. This becomes especially evident following suppression of TrkB activity. TrkB inhibition results in a 2–3 fold increase in cortical precursors displaying EGFP-positive condensed apoptotic nuclei and a 2–4 fold increase in cortical precursors that stained immunopositive for cleaved caspase-3. BDNF can also promote NSC and NPC proliferation through Akt activation and PTEN inactivation. Some studies suggest that BDNF may promote neuronal differentiation.

== Research ==
Preliminary research has focused on the possible links between BDNF and depression.

== Stakeholders ==
Since BDNF is associated with neurodegenerative and psychiatric disorders, multiple groups are affected by its measurement and clinical interpretation. Lower BDNF levels have been found to signify Alzheimer's disease and major depressive disorders. As a result, patients with neurological or mood disorders may be affected by how BDNF is diagnosed, treated, monitored, or rehabilitated.

Clinicians, such as neurologists and psychiatrists, have expressed interest in BDNF being a potential biomarker for tracking disease progression and therapeutic response. However, current standard measurement techniques rely mainly on serum or plasma sampling using enzyme-linked immunosorbent assays, commonly known as ELISA. This requires laboratory infrastructure and invasive blood collection, making it a restrictive monitoring process for patients.

Due to this, researchers and diagnostic developers have explored alternative detection strategies, including non-invasive sampling methods and biosensor-based platforms. The ultimate goal of these is to improve accessibility and enable longitudinal monitoring of BDNF levels. Broader implementation of reliable BDNF measurement may influence clinical decision-making and public health approaches to neurodegenerative and psychiatric conditions.

== See also ==
- Epigenetics of depression § Brain-derived neurotrophic factor
- Epigenetics of schizophrenia § Methylation of BDNF
- Psychoplastogen
- Tropomyosin receptor kinase B § Agonists
