= Postmortem studies =

Type of neurobiological research

Postmortem studies are a type of neurobiological research, which provides information to researchers and individuals who will have to make medical decisions in the future. Postmortem researchers conduct a longitudinal study of the brain of an individual, who has some sort of phenomenological condition (i.e. cannot speak, trouble moving left side of body, Alzheimer's, etc.) that is examined after death. Researchers look at certain lesions in the brain that could have an influence on cognitive or motor functions. These irregularities, damage, or other cerebral anomalies observed in the brain are attributed to an individual's pathophysiology and their environmental surroundings. Postmortem studies provide a unique opportunity for researchers to study different brain attributes that would be unable to be studied on a living person.

Postmortem studies allow researchers to determine causes and cure for certain diseases and functions. It is critical for researchers to develop hypotheses, in order to discover the characteristics that are meaningful to a particular disorder. The results that the researcher discovers from the study will help the researcher trace the location in the brain to specific behaviors.

When tissue from a postmortem study is obtained it is imperative that the researcher ensures the quality is adequate to study. This is specifically important when an individual is researching gene expression (i.e. DNA, RNA, and proteins). Some key ways researchers monitor the quality are by determining the pain level/time of death of the individual, pH of the tissue, refrigeration time and temperature of storage, time until the brain tissue is frozen, and the thawing conditions. As well as finding out specific information about the individual's life such as: age, sex, legal or illegal substance use, and a treatment analysis of the individual.

== Background ==
Postmortem studies have been used to further the understanding of the brain for centuries. Before the time of the MRI, CAT Scan, or X-ray it was one of the few ways to study the relation between behavior and the brain.

Approximate location of Broca's and Wernicke's areas highlighted in white.

=== Broca ===
Paul Broca used postmortem studies to link a specific area of the brain with speech production.

His research began when he noticed that a patient with an aphasic stroke had lesions in the left hemisphere of his brain. His research and theory continued over time.

The most notable of his research subjects was Tan (named for the only syllable he could utter). Tan had lesions in his brain caused by syphilis. These lesions were determined to cover the area of his brain that was important for speech production.

The area of the brain that Broca identified is now known as Broca's area; damage to this section of the brain can lead to Expressive aphasia.

=== Wernicke ===
Karl Wernicke also used postmortem studies to link specific areas of the brain with speech production. However his research focused more on patients who could speak, however their speech made little sense and/or had trouble understanding spoken words or sentences.

His research in language comprehension and the brain also found it to be localized in the left hemisphere, but in a different section. This area is known as Wernicke's area; damage to this section can lead to Receptive aphasia.

== Benefits ==
Postmortem studies allows for researchers to give information that is relevant to individuals by explaining the causes of particular diseases and behaviors. This is in hopes that others can avoid some of these experiences in the future. Postmortem studies also improve medical knowledge and help to determine whether changes happen in the brain itself or in the actual disorder. By doing this researchers are then able to help prioritize experimental studies and integrate the studies into animal and cell research. Another benefit to postmortem studies is that researchers have the ability to make a wide range of discoveries, because of the many different techniques used to obtain tissue samples. Postmortem studies are extremely important and unique despite their limitations.

== Limitations ==
Postmortem brain samples are limited resources, because it is extremely difficult for a researcher to get a hold of an individual's brain. The researchers ask their participants or the families to consent to allowing them to study the loved one's brain; however, there has been a falling rate of consent in the last few years. Subsequently, researchers have to use indirect methods to study the locations and processes of the brain. Another limitation to postmortem studies is the continuous funding and the time it takes to conduct a longitudinal study. Postmortem longitudinal studies usually take place at the time of assessment until the time of death about 20–30 years.
