= Neurotrophin mimetics =

Receptor modulators

Neurotrophin mimetics are small molecules or peptide like molecules that can modulate the action of the neurotrophin receptor. One of the main causes of neurodegeneration involves changes in the expression of neurotrophins (NTs) and/or their receptors (TrkA, TrkB, TrkC and p75NTR). Indeed, these imbalances or changes in their activity, lead to neuronal damage resulting in neurological and neurodegenerative conditions. The therapeutic properties of neurotrophins attracted the focus of many researchers during the years, but the poor pharmacokinetic properties, such as reduced bioavailability and low metabolic stability, the hyperalgesia, the inability to penetrate the blood–brain barrier and the short half-lives render the large neurotrophin proteins not suitable to be implemented as drugs.

For this reason, several efforts have been made to develop neurotrophin mimetics (small molecules and peptidomimetics) that can modulate the action of the neurotrophin receptors (Trks and p75NTR) and possess drug-like pharmacokinetic and pharmacodynamic profiles. Specifically, these mimetics can be classified as TrkA and TrkB receptor agonists and p75NTR modulators/antagonists.

== Synthetic small molecule neurotrophin mimetics ==
=== TrkA agonists ===
Among the TrkA agonists, the small molecule gambogic amide exerts a potent neurotrophic activity decreasing apoptosis in primary hippocampal neurons. The non-peptidic TrkA agonist MT2 protects neurons from Aβ amyloid-mediated death in NGF-deficient neurons and talaumidin and its derivatives show neuroprotective effects, promoting neurite outgrowth in PC12 cells. Furthermore, the peptidomimetic cerebrolysin is known for its protective role in Alzheimer's disease (AD). It was shown to improve the activities of daily living and the psychiatric symptoms in patients with mild to severe form of AD, after intravenous administration in a double-blind trial. In addition, the cyclic peptide tavilermide (MIM-D3), acting as a partial TrkA receptor agonist, showed a relevant improvement of cognitive capacities of treated aged rats, leading to a selective survival of the cholinergic neurons.

A phase 3 clinical trial of 5% and 1% tavilermide ophthalmic solutions for the treatment of dry eye was completed in 2020 (NCT03925727), with positive results concerning safety and efficacy. Recent studies demonstrated the neurotrophic activity of carvacrol by inducing neurite outgrowth and phosphorylation of TrkA in cells deprived of NGF. The same research group investigated the neurotrophic effect of the well-known antibiotic doxycycline and they found that it prevents amyloid toxicity in a Drosophila model of AD both in vitro and in vivo and induces neuritogenesis by activation of TrkA.

Additionally, some novel DHEA derivatives were shown to be TrkA agonists. In particular, the C17-spiroepoxy derivative, BNN-27, induces phosphorylation of TrkA in neuronal and glial cells in culture and it exerts antiapoptotic effect without inducing hyperalgesia. Moreover, it improved memorizing abilities in rats after i.p. administration and restored the myelin loss in cuprizone-induced demyelination in vivo. Moreover, the C17-spirocyclopryl DHEA derivatives, ENT-A010 and ENT-A013, were shown to be potent TrkA agonists. In particular, ENT-A010 acts as dual TrkA and TrkB agonist while, ENT-A013 acts as a selective TrkA agonist. Both induce phosphorylation of TrkA and its downstream signaling pathways, and promote cell survival of PC12 cells from serum deprivation. In addition, they exhibit potent neuroprotective effects in dorsal root ganglia and anti-amyloid activity in hippocampal neurons.

=== TrkB agonists ===
TrkB agonists have received extensive interest from the scientific community resulting in the synthesis and biological evaluation of a large number of mimetics. Deoxygedunin, with a selective TrkB activity, is able to promote axon regeneration in topical treatments. Furthermore, it shows efficacy in two Parkinson's disease (PD) animal models, leading to the protection of locomotor function and the reduction of neuronal death in dopaminergic neurons. A number of studies corroborated that the flavonoid 7,8-Dihydroxyflavone (7,8-DHF) shows neuroprotection in PD and Huntington's disease (HD) models together with antioxidant activity and enhancement of motor neuronal survival, motor function and spine density in amyotrophic lateral sclerosis (ALS) model. The benzothiazole riluzole exerts neuroprotective effects by increasing BDNF and GDNF levels with improvement of motor neuron survival. It has been approved for the treatment of ALS and delays the onset of ventilator-dependence or tracheostomy in some people and may increase survival by two to three months. Furthermore, several combinations of riluzole with other drugs are in clinical trials (NCT02588677, NCT03127267).

Brimonidine exerts neuroprotective effects in retinal ganglion cells (RGCs) through up-regulation of the expression of BDNF in these cells. It is used in the treatment of glaucoma as eye drops to reduce intraocular pressure (IOP) under the brand name Lumify®. Different drugs, used against PD also behave as neurotrophin mimetics such as rotigotine, selegiline, rasagiline, memantine and levodopa interacting with TrkB and increasing BDNF expression. Furthermore, of particular note, the groups of F. Longo and S. Massa discovered small molecule neurotrophic mimetics exhibiting specificity for TrkB at nanomolar concentrations. In particular, LM22A-4, prevents neuronal death in in vitro models of AD, HD and PD.

Among the peptidomimetic TrkB agonists, the dimeric dipeptide GSB-106 showed neurotrophic and neuroprotective effects by specific activation of TrkB and its signaling pathways. Furthermore, the tricyclic dimeric peptide TDP6 acts as a TrkB agonist mimicking BDNF and induces autophosphorylation of TrkB in primary oligodendrocyte cultures, leading to oligodendrocyte myelination. Regarding DHEA derivatives, the C17-spiroepoxy analogue, BNN-20, binds with high affinity to TrkB, showing antiapoptotic activity in vitro. Its neuroprotective activity was analyzed in the Weaver mouse genetic model of PD in which long term administration of BNN-20 protects the dopaminergic neurons by mimicking BDNF and induces antiapoptotic, antioxidant and anti-inflammatory effects.

=== p75NTR modulators ===
In this class it is worthwhile to highlight the small non-peptide molecules LM22A-24 and LM11A-31 developed by Longo and Massa. Through the modulation of p75NTR activity, these compounds downregulate degenerative and upregulate trophic signaling. In particular, LM11A-31 was found to inhibit several pathophysiological mechanisms involved in AD and related to p75NTR. Oral administration in AD mice models reduces degeneration of cholinergic neurites. Furthermore, by a direct activation of p75NTR signaling and inhibition of apoptotic pathway, it improves motor function in a spinal cord injury (SCI) mice model and leads to an antiapoptotic effect in mice after traumatic brain injury (TBI). In February 2017, a phase 2 clinical trial started focusing on the evaluation of the safety of LM11A-31 in mild to moderate AD (NCT03069014). This study was completed in June 2020, but the results have not been published yet.

Another drug belonging to the class of p75NTR antagonists is THX-B, which inhibits NGF-p75NTR binding and prevents the death of RGCs in axotomy and glaucoma. In addition, in combination with LM22A-24, THX-B delays the loss of retinal structure, prevents RGC degeneration and preserves ganglion cell layer-inner plexiform layer thickness with a better efficacy compared to LM22A-24. Finally, a p75NTR antagonist, EVT901, was able to improve functional outcomes in two models of traumatic brain injury. Furthermore it was found to reduce inflammation in vivo in the TGFAD344 rat model of AD.

== Natural neurotrophin mimetics ==
There are a number of natural products with neurotrophic activity, which results from several mechanisms including enhancing BDNF gene transcription, upregulating the expression of BDNF and TrkB, and extracellular signal-regulated kinase (ERK) and CREB signalling.

The first discovered non-protein neurotrophic natural product was lactacystin, isolated from a culture broth of Streptomyces sp. Magnolol and honokiol, the main constituents of Magnolia officinalis and Magnolia obovata stem bark, have been reported to have neurotrophic activity in primary cultured rat cortical by enhancing the BDNF expression. Merrilactone A, jiadifenin, jiadifenolide, (1R,10S)-2-oxo-3,4-dehydroxyneomajucin, jiadifenoxolane A, (2R)-hydroxynorneomajucin, 11-O-debenzoyltashironin, tricycloillicinone, and bicycloillicinone, natural products of the Illicium family have been shown to promote neurite outgrowth in primary cultures of cortical neurons of fetal rats. Neurotrophic properties are also possessed by several members of the Lycopodium alkaloids (huperzine A, lyconadins, complanadine A and B, and nankakurine A and B). Studies have shown that huperazine A can elevate the levels of NGF and BDNF. Synthesis of NGF can be upregulated by administration of cyathanediterpenoids specifically erinacines, scabronines and cyrneines.

Some flavonoids, Isoflavonoids and neoflavonoids were found to have neuroprotective activity. Among the effective flavonoids, luteolin from Lonicera japonica sp., isorhamnetin from Opuntia ficus-indica, genistein from Genista tinctoria, and calycosin from Astragalus membranaceus showed the most promising effects by increasing the mRNA expression and protein secretion of NGF, GDNF, and BDNF. Paecilomycine A and spirotenuipesines A and B, members of the trichothecenes, isolated from the fruiting bodies of Paecilomycestenuipes, have significant neurotrophic profiles especially paecilomycine A which can stimulate the synthesis of neurotrophic factors. Polyprenylatedacylphloroglucinols (PPAPs) represented by hyperforin, hypericin and garsubellin A, have neurotrophic like properties. Hyperforin, isolated from the herb St. John's wort (Hypericum perforatum), can stimulate the upregulation of the TrkB receptor.

Beside natural products, there are some small molecules of natural origin that exert neurotrophic activities such as: Panaxytriol (promotes NGF-induced neurite outgrowth in PC-12 cells); 7,8-dihydroxyflavone (TrkB activator); Deoxygedunin (BDNF mimetic); Kansuinin E (promotes neurotrophic activity, most likely through TrkA activation); Tripchlorolide (stimulates expression of BDNF mRNA); Fucoxanthin (increases BDNF production and activates PKA/CREB pathway); Silibinin (Activate hippocampal ROS-BDNF-TrkB patway).
