= C28H34O6 =

The molecular formula C_{28}H_{34}O_{6} (molar mass: 466.566 g/mol) may refer to:

- Benzodrocortisone, or hydrocortisone 17-benzoate
- Deoxygedunin
