= C17H26O3 =

The molecular formula C_{17}H_{26}O_{3} (molar mass :278.39 g/mol) may refer to:

- Isofalcarintriol, a polyacetylene found in carrots
- Panaxytriol, a fatty alcohol found in ginseng
- Paradol, the active flavor constituent of the seeds of Guinea pepper
