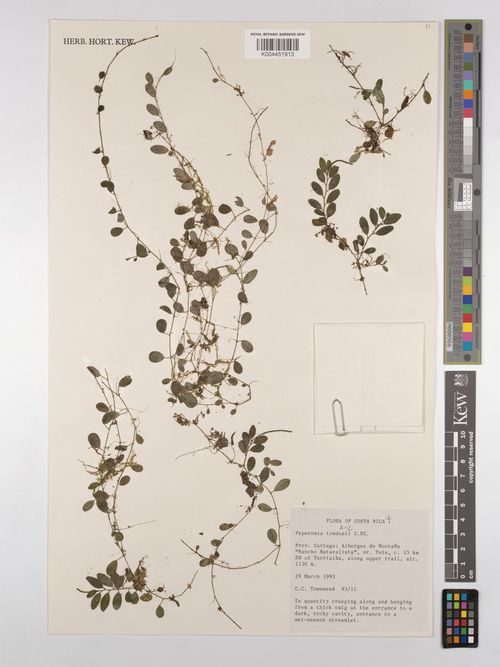

Scientific classification
- Kingdom: Plantae
- Clade: Tracheophytes
- Clade: Angiosperms
- Clade: Magnoliids
- Order: Piperales
- Family: Piperaceae
- Genus: Peperomia
- Species: P. tonduzii

Binomial name
- Peperomia tonduzii C.DC.

= Peperomia tonduzii =

Species of flowering plant

Peperomia tonduzii is a species of epiphytic subshrub in the genus Peperomia found in Costa Rica. It primarily grows on wet tropical biomes. Its conservation status is Threatened.

== Description ==
The first specimens where collected in Costa Rica.

Peperomia tonduzii has alternate petiolate leaves, elliptic and obovate at base, acute at tip, rounded on both sides, and not densely villous. It's 1-nerved, the terminal catkins are pedunculated, filiform, several times exceeding the leaves. It has glabrous rhizomes, obovate ovary, and perpilose stigma.

== Taxonomy and naming ==
It was described in 1891 by Casimir de Candolle in Bulletin de la Société Botanique de Belgique, from specimens collected by Pittier . It gets its name from Adolphe Tonduz.

== Distribution and habitat ==
It is found in Costa Rica. It grows on epiphyte environment and is a subshrub. It grows on wet tropical biomes.

== Conservation ==
This species is assessed as Threatened, in a preliminary report.
