= Gedunin =

Names
- IUPAC name Gedunin
- Systematic IUPAC name [(1S,2R,4S,7S,8S,11R,12R,17R,19R)-7-(furan-3-yl)-1,8,12,16,16-pentamethyl-5,15-dioxo-3,6-dioxapentacyclo[9.8.0.0^{2,4}.0^{2,8}.0^{12,17}]nonadec-13-en-19-yl] acetate
- Other names: Gedunine; (-)-Gedunin; (1S,3aS,4aR,4bS,5R,6aR,10aR,10bR,12aS)-1-(Furan-3-yl)-4b,7,7,10a,12a-pentamethyl-3,8-dioxo-1,3,3a,4b,5,6,6a,7,8,10a,10b,11,12,12a-tetradecahydronaphtho[2,1-f]oxireno[2,3-d]isochromen-5-yl acetate

Identifiers
CAS Number	2753-30-2
3D model (JSmol)	Interactive image
ChEBI	CHEBI:65954
ChEMBL	ChEMBL465226
ChemSpider	10176979
ECHA InfoCard	100.215.769
EC Number	689-008-9
PubChem CID	12004512
UNII	VH4BN8F5Z5
CompTox Dashboard (EPA)	DTXSID3041033
- InChI: InChI=1S/C28H34O7/c1-15(29)33-20-13-18-24(2,3)19(30)8-10-25(18,4)17-7-11-26(5)21(16-9-12-32-14-16)34-23(31)22-28(26,35-22)27(17,20)6/h8-10,12,14,17-18,20-22H,7,11,13H2,1-6H3/t17-,18+,20-,21+,22-,25-,26+,27+,28-/m1/s1 Key: YJXDGWUNRYLINJ-BHAPSIHVSA-N
- SMILES: CC(=O)O[C@@H]1C[C@@H]2[C@](C=CC(=O)C2(C)C)([C@@H]3[C@@]1([C@]45[C@H](O4)C(=O)O[C@H]([C@@]5(CC3)C)C6=COC=C6)C)C

Properties
Chemical formula	C_{28}H_{34}O_{7}
Molar mass	482.573 g·mol^{−1}
- Except where otherwise noted, data are given for materials in their standard state (at 25 °C [77 °F], 100 kPa). Infobox references

Gedunin is a pentacyclic triterpenoid with the molecular formula C_{28}H_{34}O_{7}. It is most notably found in Azadirachta indica, but is a constituent of several other plants. Gedunin shows therapeutic potential in the treatment of leukemia, and Parkinson's disease.

== Natural occurrence ==
Azadirachta indica is the most notable source of gedunin, but it has also been found in the following plants:

- Cedrela fissilis
- Cedrela odorata
- Cedrela salvadorensis
- Entandrophragma angolense
- Khaya grandifoliola
- Melia azedarach
- Toona sinensis
- Xylocarpus granatum
