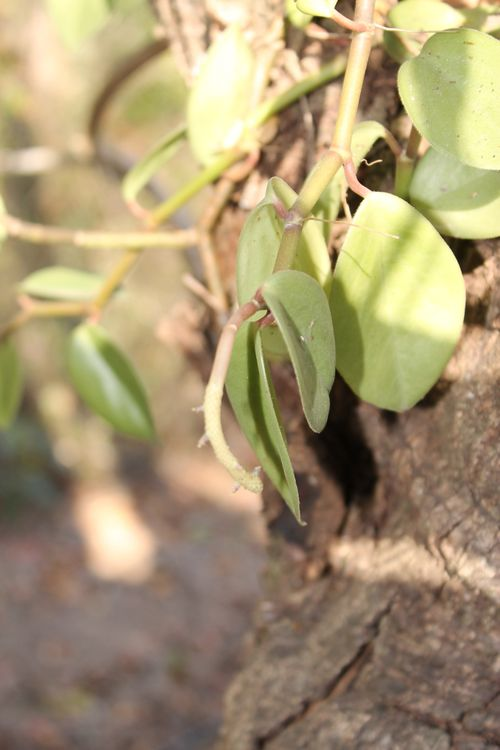

Scientific classification
- Kingdom: Plantae
- Clade: Tracheophytes
- Clade: Angiosperms
- Clade: Magnoliids
- Order: Piperales
- Family: Piperaceae
- Genus: Peperomia
- Species: P. tenuicaulis

Binomial name
- Peperomia tenuicaulis C.DC.

= Peperomia tenuicaulis =

Species of epiphyte

Peperomia tenuicaulis is a species of epiphyte in the genus Peperomia found in the Americas. It primarily grows on wet tropical biomes. Its conservation status is Not Threatened.

== Description ==
The first specimens where collected at 1500 metres elevation on Costa Rica.

== Taxonomy and naming ==
It was described in 1898 by Casimir de Candolle in Anales del Instituto Físico-Geográfico y del Museo Nacional de Costa Rica, from specimens collected by Adolphe Tonduz in 1896. It gets its name from tenui + caulis, which means Thin stalk.

== Distribution and habitat ==
It is endemic to the Americas. It grows on epiphyte environment. It grows on wet tropical biomes.

== Conservation ==
This species is listed as Not Threatened under the Angiosperm Extinction Risk Predictions v1.
