= C15H18O7 =

The molecular formula C_{15}H_{18}O_{7} (molar mass: 310.30 g/mol, exact mass: 310.1053 u) may refer to:

- Jiadifenolide
- Picrotin
