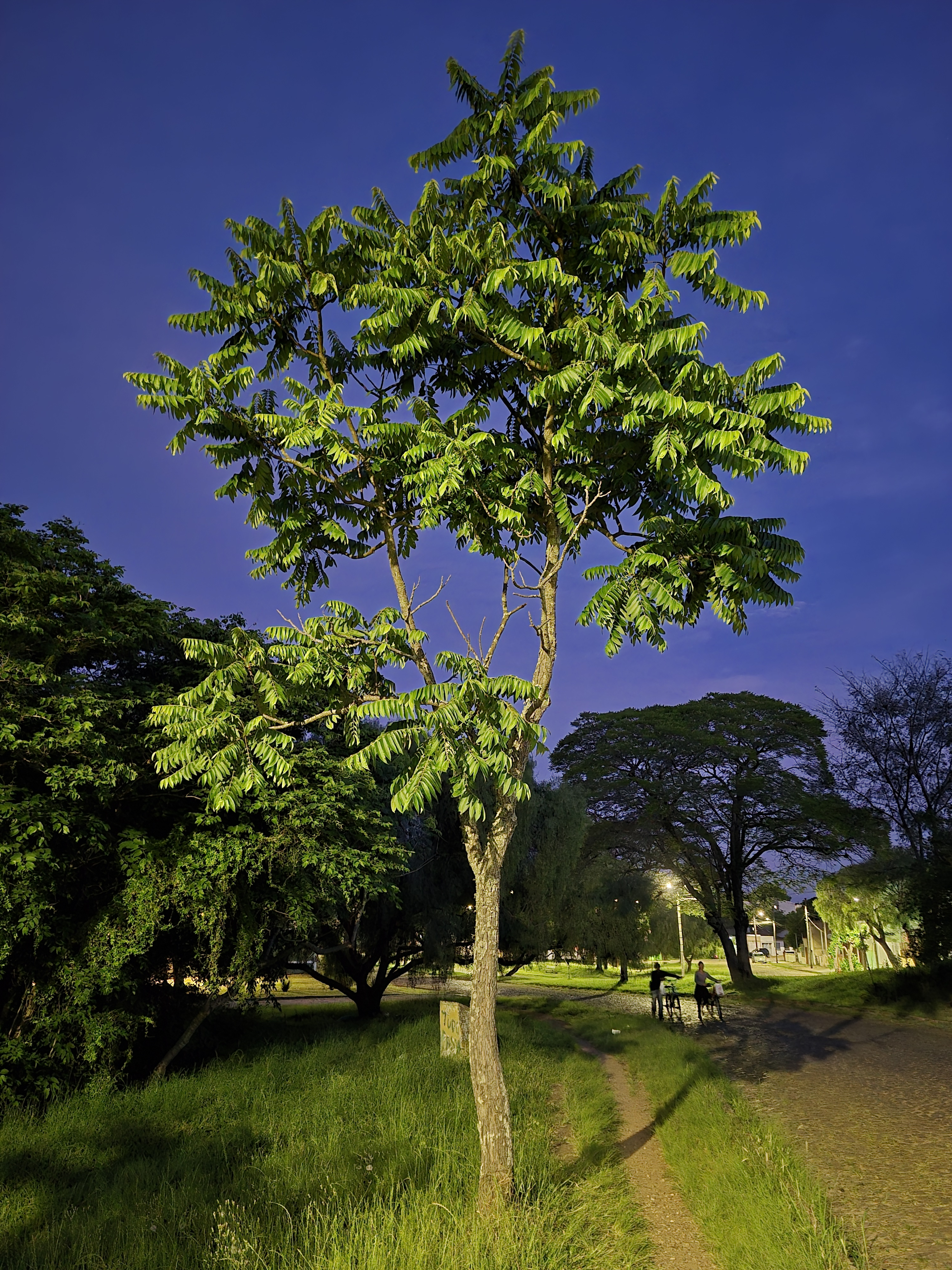
- In Brazil

Conservation status
- Vulnerable (IUCN 3.1)

Scientific classification
- Kingdom: Plantae
- Clade: Tracheophytes
- Clade: Angiosperms
- Clade: Eudicots
- Clade: Rosids
- Order: Sapindales
- Family: Meliaceae
- Genus: Cedrela
- Species: C. fissilis

Binomial name
- Cedrela fissilis Vell.

= Cedrela fissilis =

Species of tree

Cedrela fissilis is a species of tree in the family Meliaceae. It is native to Central and South America, where it is distributed from Costa Rica to Argentina. Its common names include Argentine cedar, cedro batata, cedro blanco, "Acaju-catinga" (its Global Trees entry) and cedro colorado.

Once a common lowland forest tree, this species has been overexploited for timber and is now considered to be endangered. A few populations are stable, but many have been reduced, fragmented, and extirpated. The wood is often sold in batches with Cuban cedar (Cedrela odorata).

== Taxonomy ==
=== Original Description ===
Cedrela fissilis was first described by José Mariano da Conceição Vellozo in Florae Fluminensis (1829). The original protologue reads (translated):

C. fissilis. Flowers in racemose, compound inflorescences; leaves hairy beneath. (Tab. 68.a T. 2) Observations. Both species yield timber of the highest quality for construction. It is said that on the Island of São Sebastião there stands a Cedrela of such enormous size that from it a boat (scapha) could be made measuring 11 palms in width. For this to be true, the trunk would necessarily have a circumference of 44 palms.

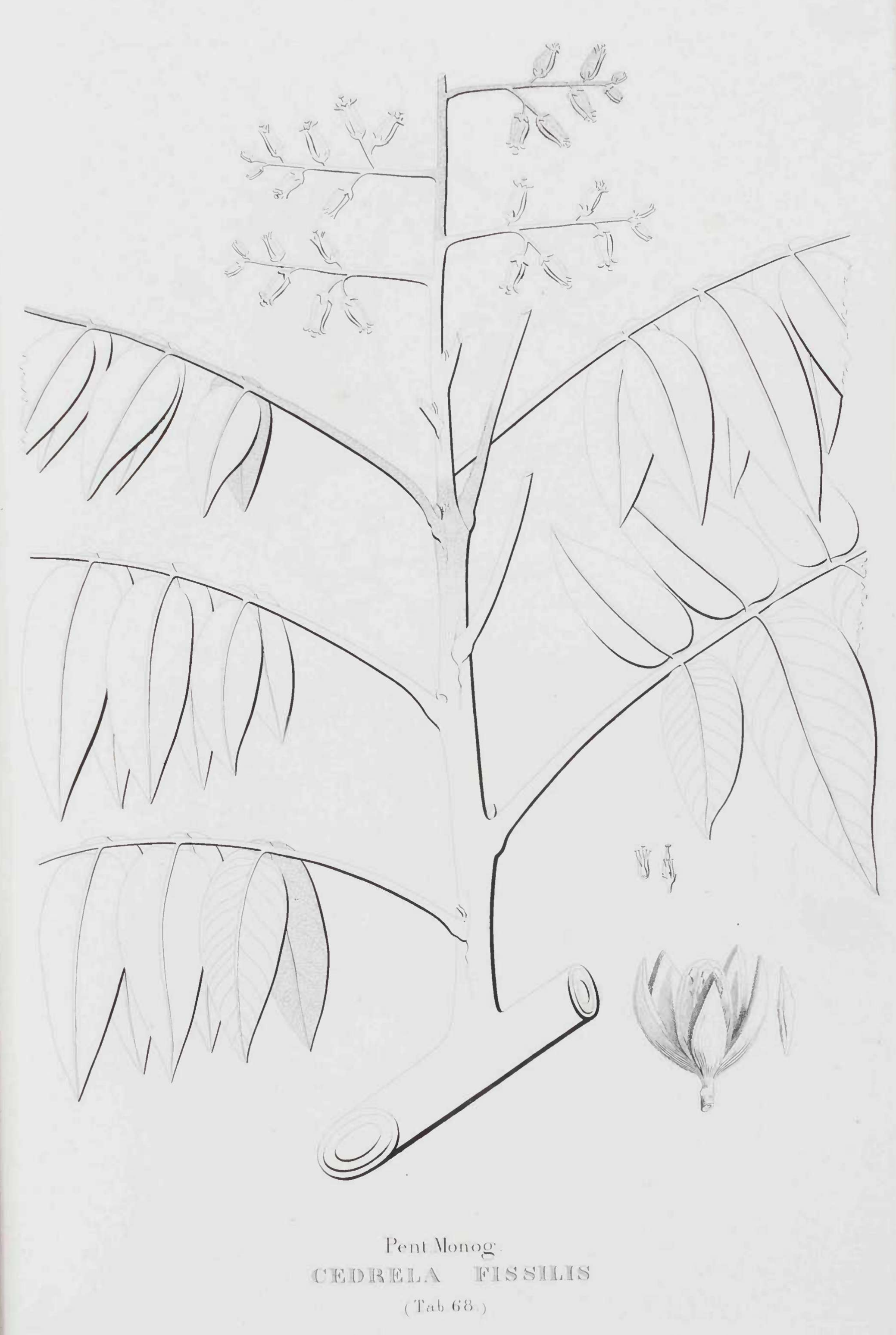
Botanical illustration of Cedrela fissilis from José Mariano da Conceição Vellozo’s Florae Fluminensis, Icones (Vol. 2, Tab. 68.a T. 2, 1829).

=== Taxonomic history ===
Cedrela brasiliensis was first described by Antoine Laurent de Jussieu in Flora Brasiliensis Meridionalis (1829), based on material collected in Minas Gerais, Brazil. Jussieu distinguished a southern variant, var. australis, from specimens near Montevideo, noting denser pubescence on the branches, petioles, peduncles, and petals, and questioned whether this form might represent a distinct species. Both C. brasiliensis and its variety australis are now regarded as synonyms of C. fissilis.

== Gallery ==
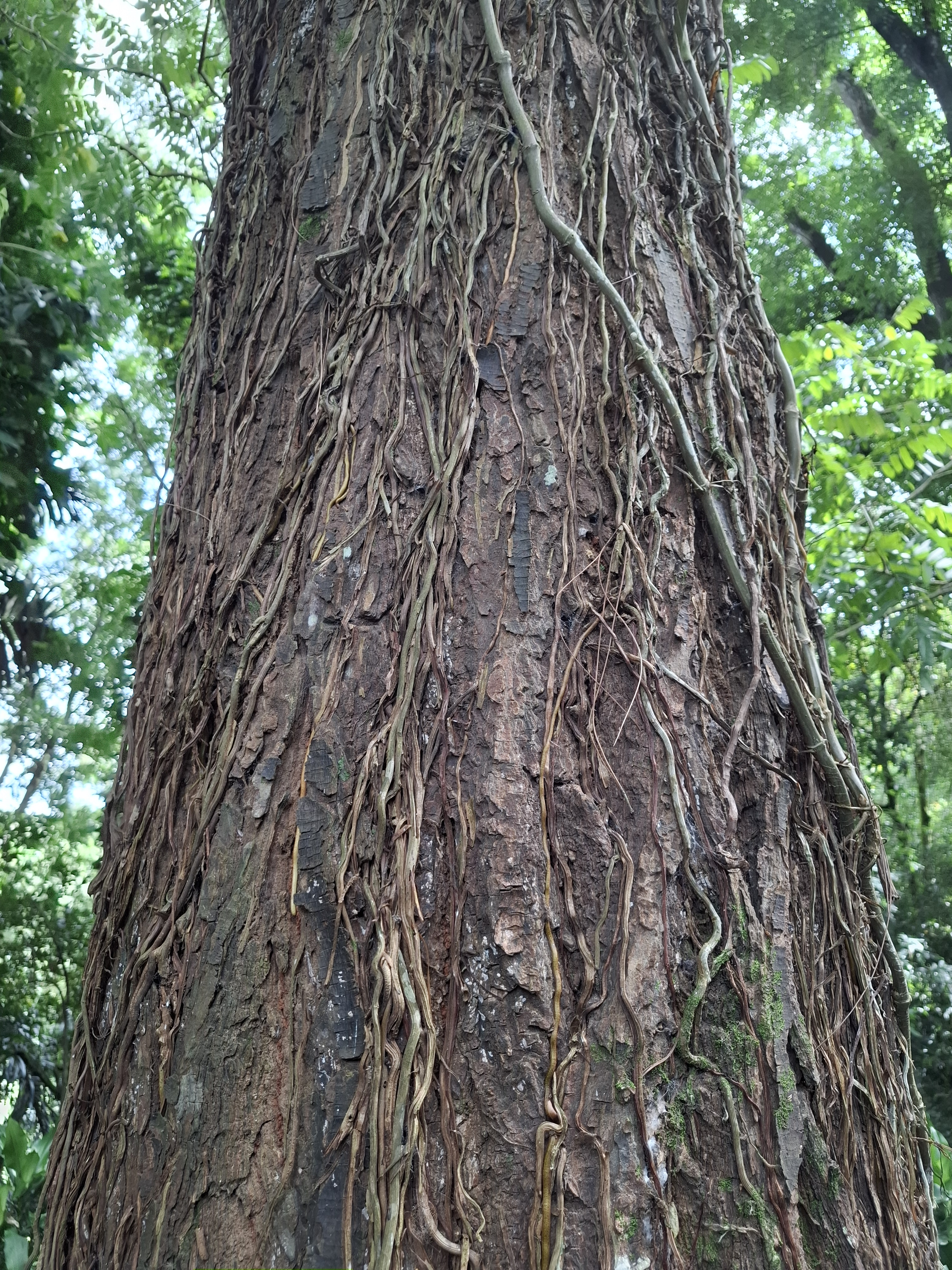
Stem

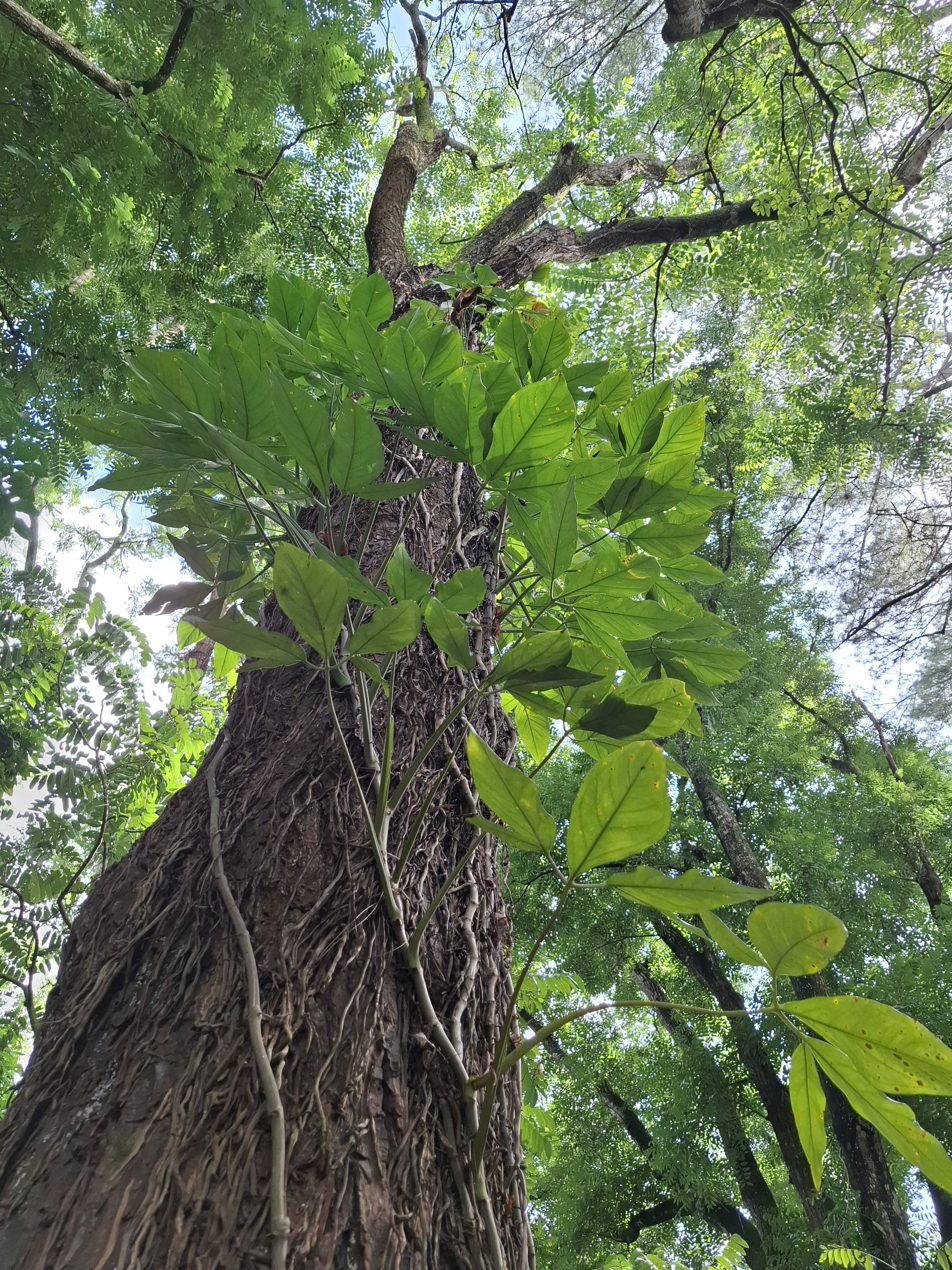
Leaves

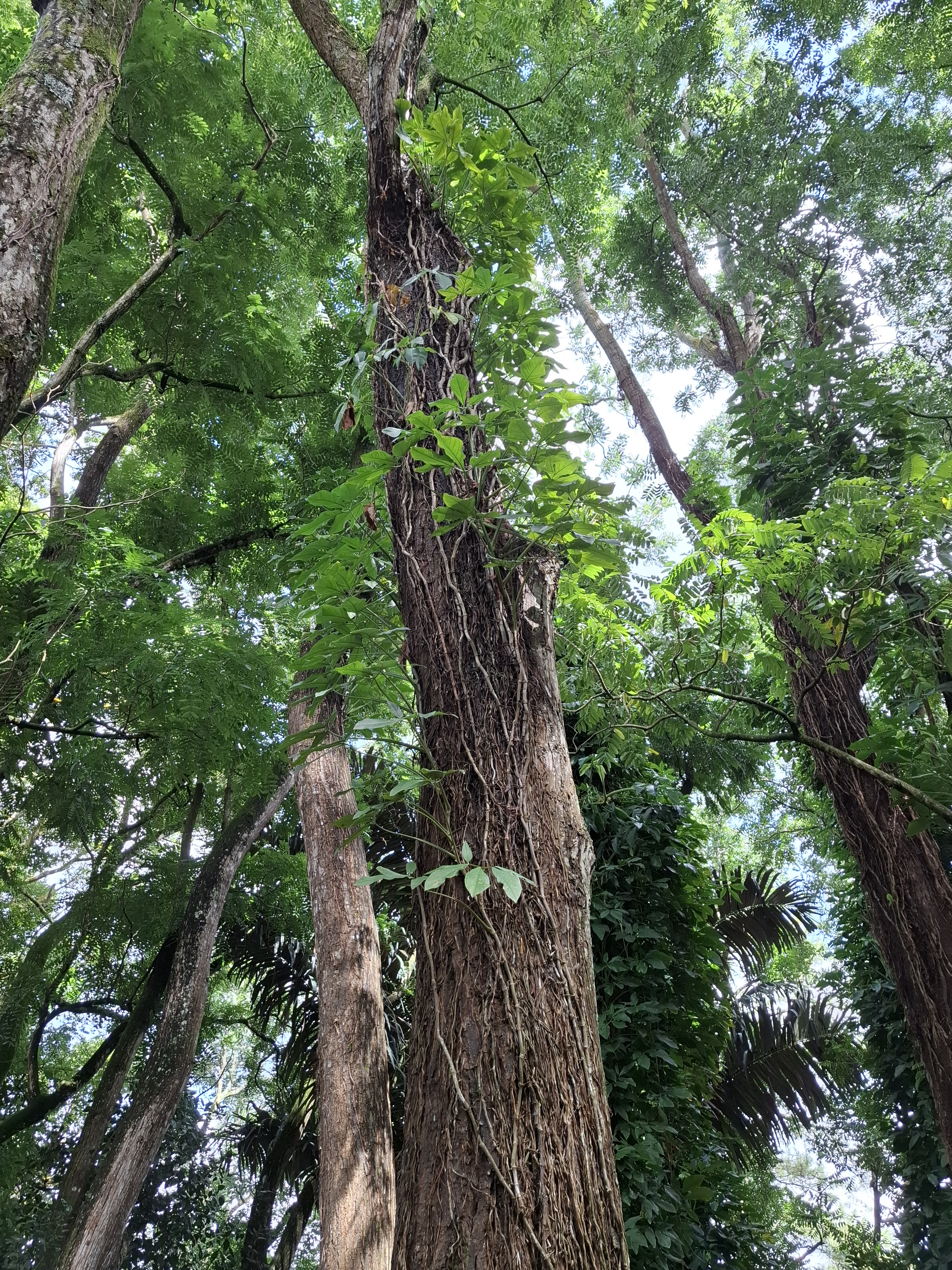
Tree

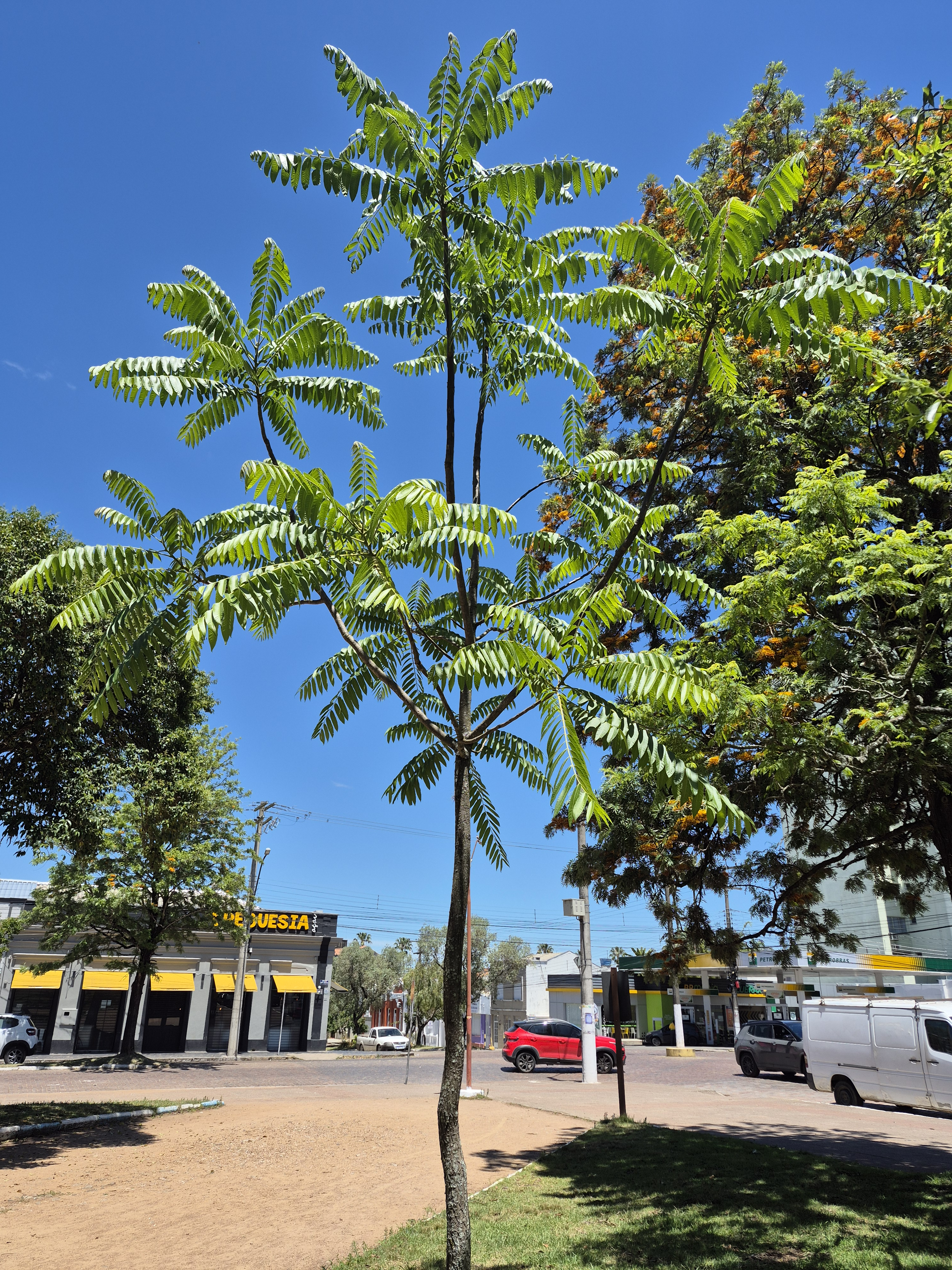
Young tree

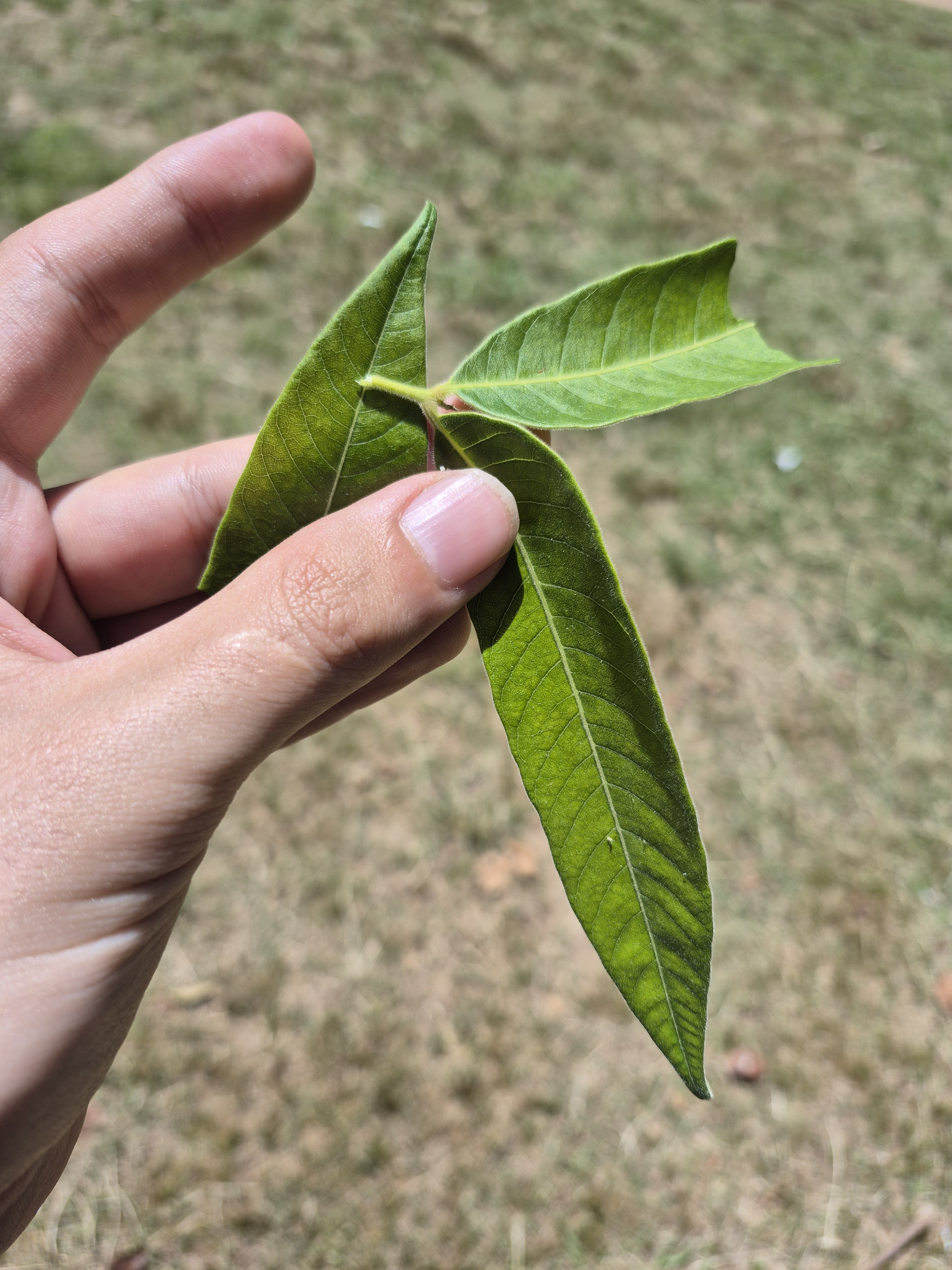
Leaflets
