= Chrysin =

- Chrysin

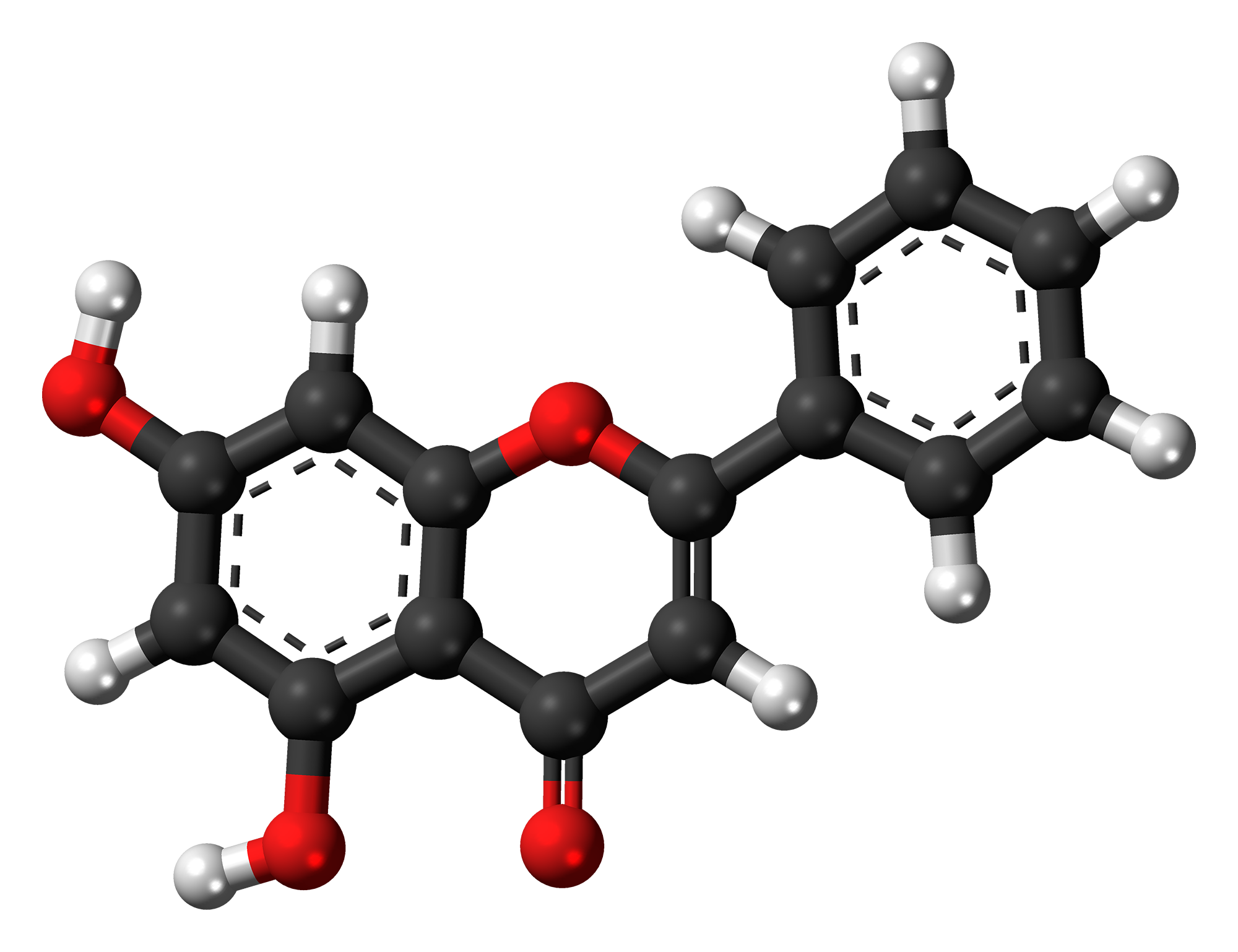

Names
- IUPAC name 5,7-Dihydroxyflavone
- Systematic IUPAC name 5,7-Dihydroxy-2-phenyl-4H-1-benzopyran-4-one
- Other names NP-005901; Galangin flavanone

Identifiers
CAS Number	480-40-0
3D model (JSmol)	Interactive image
ChEBI	CHEBI:75095
ChEMBL	ChEMBL117
ChemSpider	4444926
ECHA InfoCard	100.006.864
KEGG	C10028
PubChem CID	5281607
UNII	3CN01F5ZJ5
CompTox Dashboard (EPA)	DTXSID1022396
- InChI: InChI=1S/C15H10O4/c16-10-6-11(17)15-12(18)8-13(19-14(15)7-10)9-4-2-1-3-5-9/h1-8,16-17H Key: RTIXKCRFFJGDFG-UHFFFAOYSA-N; InChI=1/C15H10O4/c16-10-6-11(17)15-12(18)8-13 (19-14(15)7-10)9-4-2-1-3-5-9/h1-8,16-17H Key: RTIXKCRFFJGDFG-UHFFFAOYAO
- SMILES: O=C\1c3c(O/C(=C/1)c2ccccc2)cc(O)cc3O

Properties
Chemical formula	C_{15}H_{10}O_{4}
Molar mass	254.241 g·mol^{−1}
- Except where otherwise noted, data are given for materials in their standard state (at 25 °C [77 °F], 100 kPa). verify (what is ?) Infobox references

Chrysin, also called 5,7-dihydroxyflavone, is a flavone found in honey, propolis, the passion flowers, Passiflora caerulea and Passiflora incarnata, and in Oroxylum indicum. It is extracted from various plants, such as the blue passion flower (Passiflora caerulea). Following oral intake by humans, chrysin has low bioavailability and rapid excretion. It is under basic research to evaluate its safety and potential biological effects.

Chrysin is an ingredient in dietary supplements. As of 2016, there was no clinical use of chrysin, and no evidence for its effect on testosterone levels. In 2016, the US Food and Drug Administration did not recommend chrysin be included on the list of bulk drug substances that can be used in compounding under section 503A of the Federal Food, Drug, and Cosmetic Act.

== Occurrence ==
A component in various medicinal plants (e.g. Scutellaria baicalensis), chrysin is a dihydroxyflavone, a type of flavonoid. It is also found in honey, propolis, the passion flowers, Passiflora caerulea and Passiflora incarnata, in Oroxylum indicum, carrots, chamomile, many fruits, and in mushrooms, such as the mushroom Pleurotus ostreatus. It is extracted from various plants, such as the blue passion flower (Passiflora caerulea).

The amount of chrysin in honey from various plant sources is about 0.2 mg per 100 g. Chrysin is typically found at higher amounts in propolis than in honey. A 2010 study found the amount of chrysin was 0.10 mg/kg in honeydew honey, and 5.3 mg/kg in forest honeys. A 2010 study found the amount of chrysin in propolis was as much as 28 g/L. A 2013 study found the amount of chrysin in various mushrooms from the island of Lesvos, Greece, varied between 0.17 mg/kg in Lactarius deliciosus to 0.34 mg/kg in Suillus bellinii.

== Bioavailability ==
The effects of chrysin are reliant on its bioavailability and solubility. Following oral intake by humans, chrysin has low bioavailability and rapid excretion. As a result, it is poorly absorbed.

A 1998 study determined that the highest amounts in plasma was from 12 to 64 nM. As of 2015, the serum levels of chrysin have not been cited in the literature. Following oral intake by humans, the bioavailability was reported to be from 0.003% to 0.02%.

== Oral and topical application ==
There is insufficient information to determine how long chrysin has been used in pharmacy compounding. Chrysin is used as an ingredient in dietary supplements, but there is no information on systemic exposure from topical application. As of 2016, there was no evidence to support any effect of oral chrysin on testosterone levels, or an any disease-modifying activity with oral or topical formulations.

== Safety ==
A daily consumed amount of chrysin of 0.5 to 3 g is considered safe. As of 2016, there was no toxicity attributable to chrysin in clinical trials or adverse event reporting. As of 2016, clinical safety issues have not been identified. As of 2016, nonclinical data suggest potential concerns. In 2016, the US Food and Drug Administration did not recommend chrysin be included on the list of bulk drug substances that can be used in compounding under section 503A of the Federal Food, Drug, and Cosmetic Act based on consideration of the following criteria: (1) physicochemical characterization; (2) safety; (3) effectiveness; and (4) historical use of the substance in compounding.

== Research ==
As of 2016, there is no evidence for chrysin being used in human clinical applications. Research showed that orally administered chrysin does not have clinical activity as an aromatase inhibitor. Nanoformulations of polyphenols, including chrysin, are made using various carrier methods, such as liposomes and nanocapsules.

== Bibliography ==
- Brave M (23 June 2016). "Chrysin" (PDF). Pharmacy Compounding Advisory Committee, Division of Oncology Products, US Food and Drug Administration. pp. 1–13. Archived from the original (PDF) on August 4, 2016.
