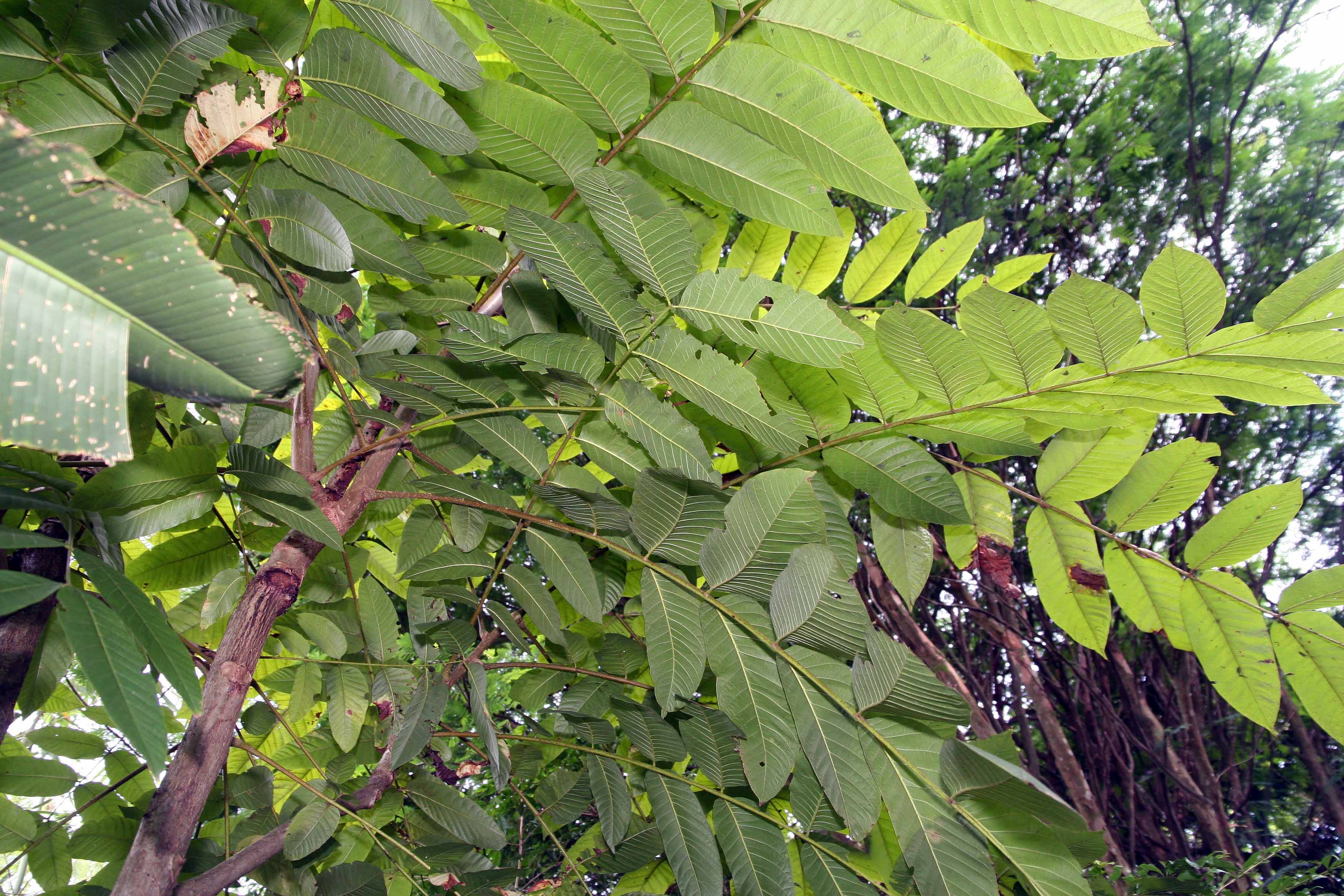

Conservation status
- Least Concern (IUCN 3.1)

Scientific classification
- Kingdom: Plantae
- Clade: Tracheophytes
- Clade: Angiosperms
- Clade: Eudicots
- Clade: Rosids
- Order: Sapindales
- Family: Meliaceae
- Genus: Cedrela
- Species: C. tonduzii

Binomial name
- Cedrela tonduzii C.DC

= Cedrela tonduzii =

Species of tree

Cedrela tonduzii (edar, cedrillo, cedro, cedro cebolla, cedro colorado, cedro dulce, cedro granadino, cedro macho, cedro pochote, West Indian cedar) is a monoecious tree that grows up to 40 m (130 ft) and can reach a diameter at breast height of up to 180 cm (71 in), but generally averages 80 cm (31 in).

This species is distributed from Chiapas (in southern Mexico) to Panama. It has been found to grow at altitudes of 1,200 to 2,800 m (3,900 to 9,200 ft) and slopes ranging from 15° to 40° of inclination. In Costa Rica it is found on the Cordillera Central, on the Cordillera de Talamanca and presumably on the Cordillera de Guanacaste.

The tree crown is open, with low vertical ramification. The bark is gray-brown and may exfoliate in small irregular plates. Leaves are compound, pinnate and range from 20 to 50 cm (7.9 to 19.7 in) in length. Each leaf has 5 to 9 pairs of leaflets, 7.5 to 15 cm (3.0 to 5.9 in) long and up to 10 cm (3.9 in) wide, light green in colour and glaucous below. Flowering occurs in April and May, being pollinated by insects. The fruit capsules appear June to July and dehisce after drying, releasing 25 to 30 seeds that are easily dispersed by wind.

The species has been named to honour the naturalist Adolphe Tonduz.

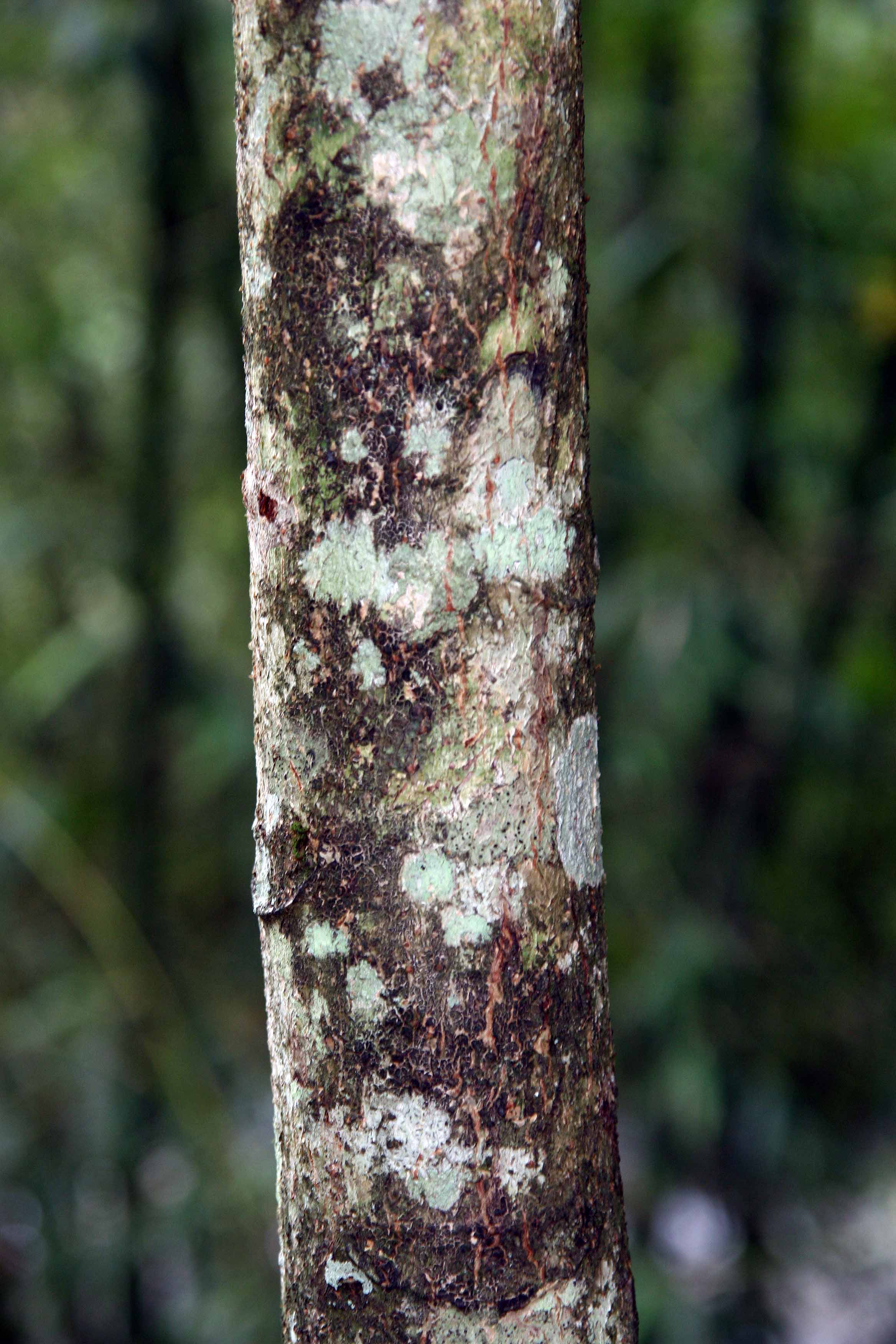
Trunk

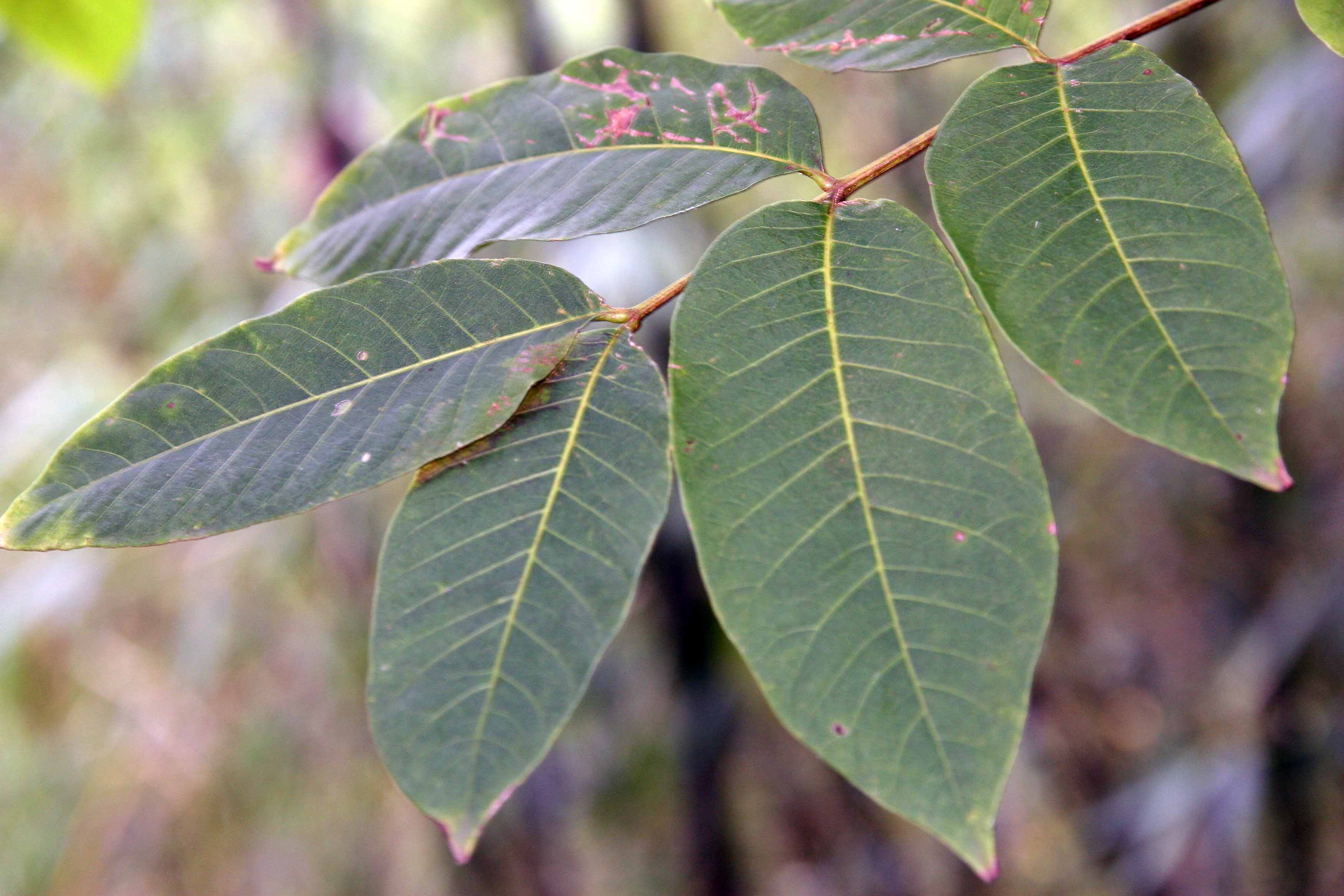
Leaf

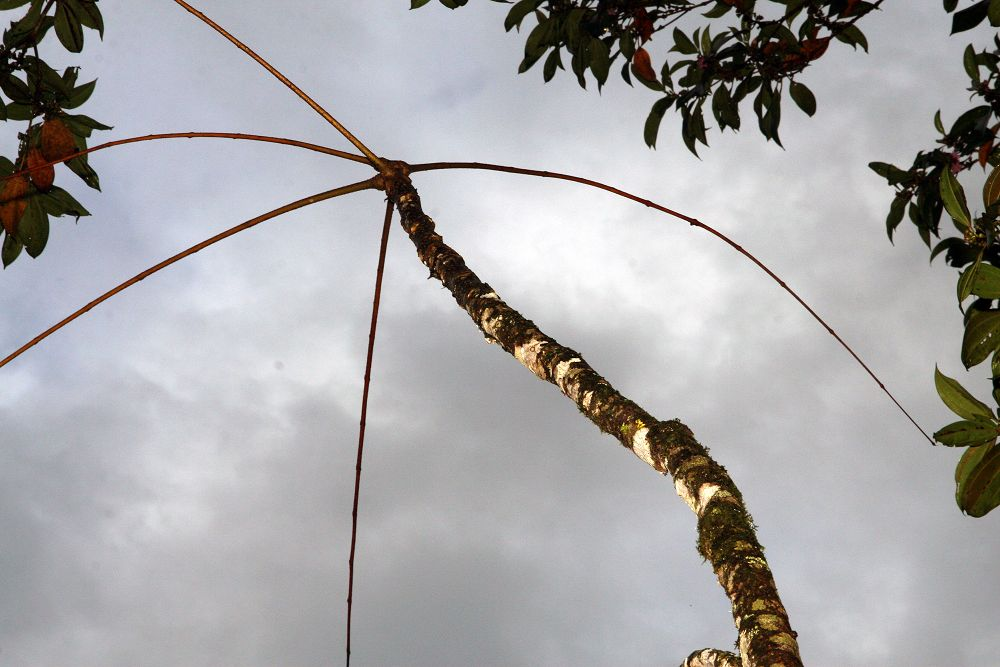
