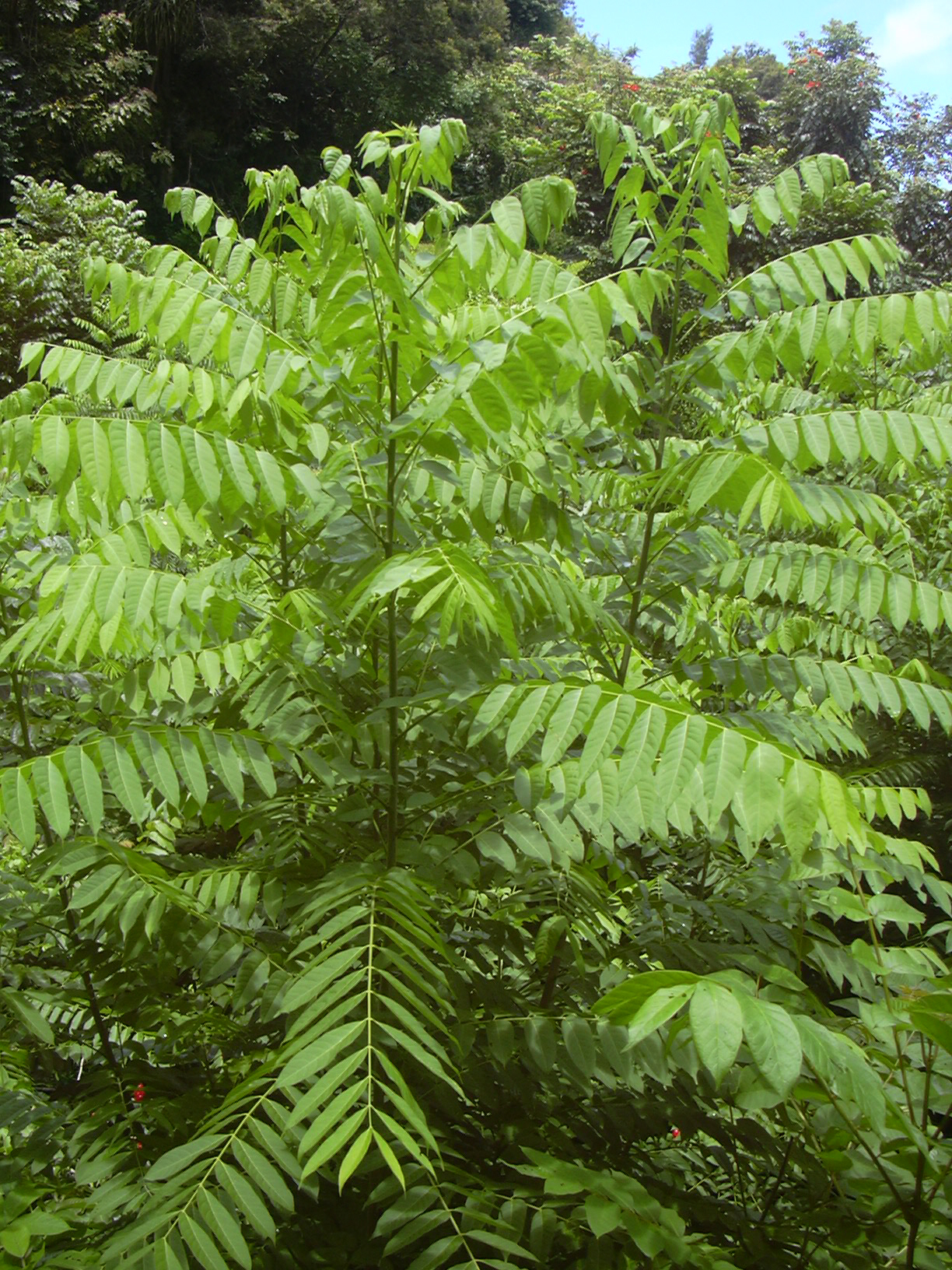
- Cedrela odorata foliage

Scientific classification
- Kingdom: Plantae
- Clade: Embryophytes
- Clade: Tracheophytes
- Clade: Angiosperms
- Clade: Eudicots
- Clade: Rosids
- Order: Sapindales
- Family: Meliaceae
- Subfamily: Cedreloideae
- Genus: Cedrela; P.Browne

Type species
- Cedrela odorata L.

Species
- See text

= Cedrela =

Genus of flowering plants

Cedrela is a genus of several species in the mahogany family, Meliaceae. They are evergreen or dry-season deciduous trees with pinnate leaves, native to the tropical and subtropical New World, from southern Mexico to northern Argentina.

On 28 October 2022, all Neo-tropic Cedrela species were added to the list of species requiring international protections, in CITES Appendix II.

== Taxonomy ==
These species are currently accepted:

- Cedrela angustifolia Sessé & Moc. ex C.DC. – Argentina, Bolivia, Brazil, Ecuador, Peru
- Cedrela discolor S.F. Blake
- Cedrela dugesii S.Watson
- Cedrela fissilis Vell. – Costa Rica south to Argentina
- Cedrela kuelapensis T.D. Penn. & Daza
- Cedrela longipetiolulata Harms
- Cedrela molinensis T.D. Penn. & Reynel
- Cedrela monroensis T.D. Penn.
- Cedrela montana Moritz ex Turcz – Colombia and Ecuador
- Cedrela nebulosa T.D. Penn. & Daza
- Cedrela odorata L. – West Indies and from 24° N in Mexico south to 28° S in Argentina
- Cedrela oaxacensis C.DC. & Rose
- Cedrela saltensis M.A. Zapater & del Castillo
- Cedrela salvadorensis Standl. – Central America
- Cedrela tonduzii C.DC. – Central America
- Cedrela weberbaueri Harms

== Distribution and habitat ==
Cedrela odorata is the most common species in the genus, widespread in seasonally dry tropical and subtropical forests; it is deciduous in the dry season which may last several months. C. angustifolia and C. montana occur at higher altitudes in moister conditions, and are evergreen or only briefly deciduous.

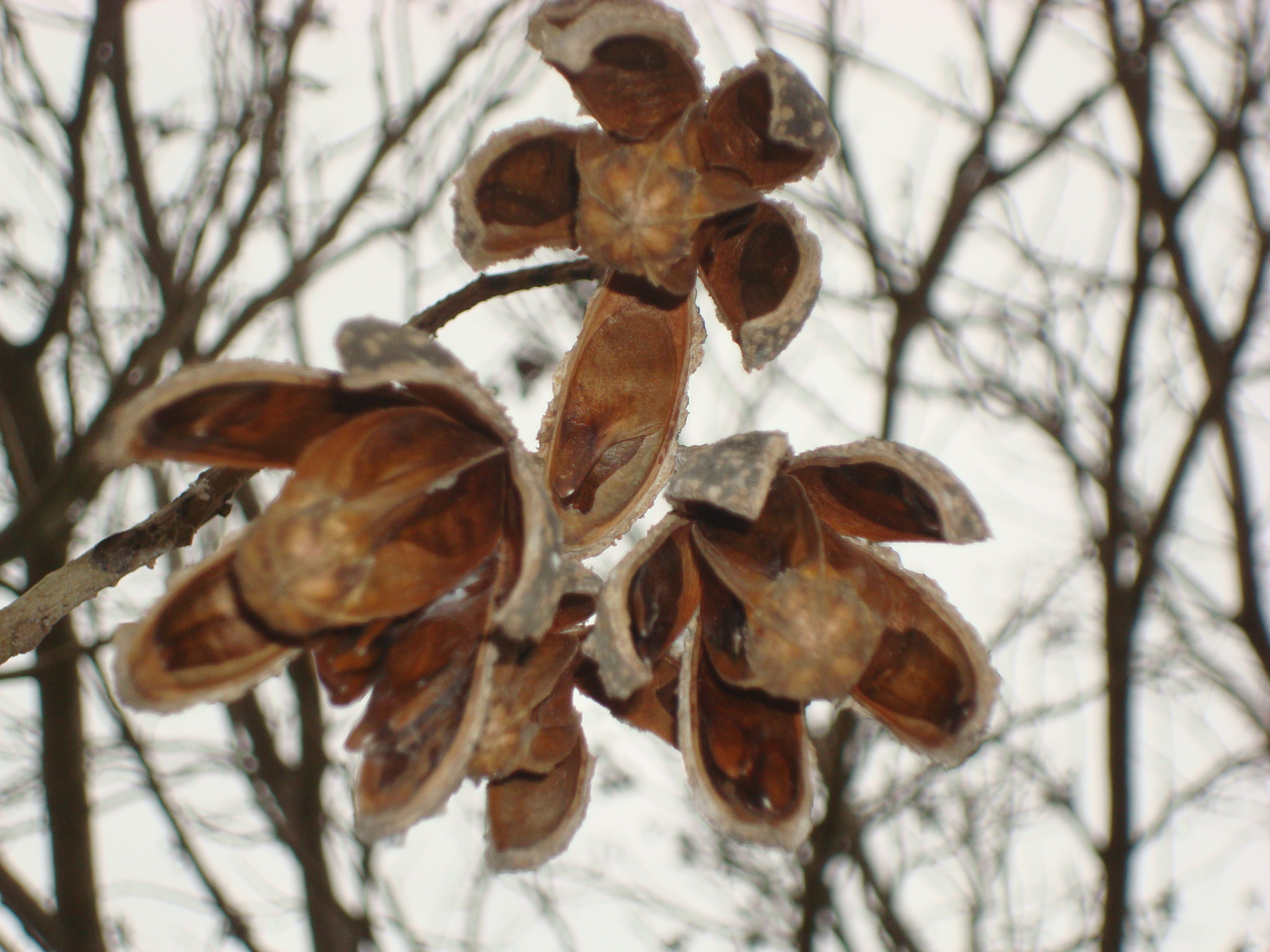
Open fruits of Cedrela sp. showing the central column

== Uses ==
Cedrela odorata is a timber tree that produces a lightweight, fragrant wood with resistance to wood-boring insects (e.g., termites) and is also rot-resistant. The wood is often sold under the name "Spanish-cedar" (it is neither Spanish nor a cedar), and is the traditional wood used for making cigar boxes, as well as being used for general outdoor and construction work, paneling and veneer wood, and necks and linings (interior strips of wood that attach the top and bottom of the guitar to the sides) of classical guitars and some electric guitars. Some species are now CITES-listed, in particular Cedrela odorata. It is also grown as an ornamental tree, and has become naturalized in some areas in Africa, southeast Asia and Hawaii. The other species have similar wood, but are less-used due to scarcity.
