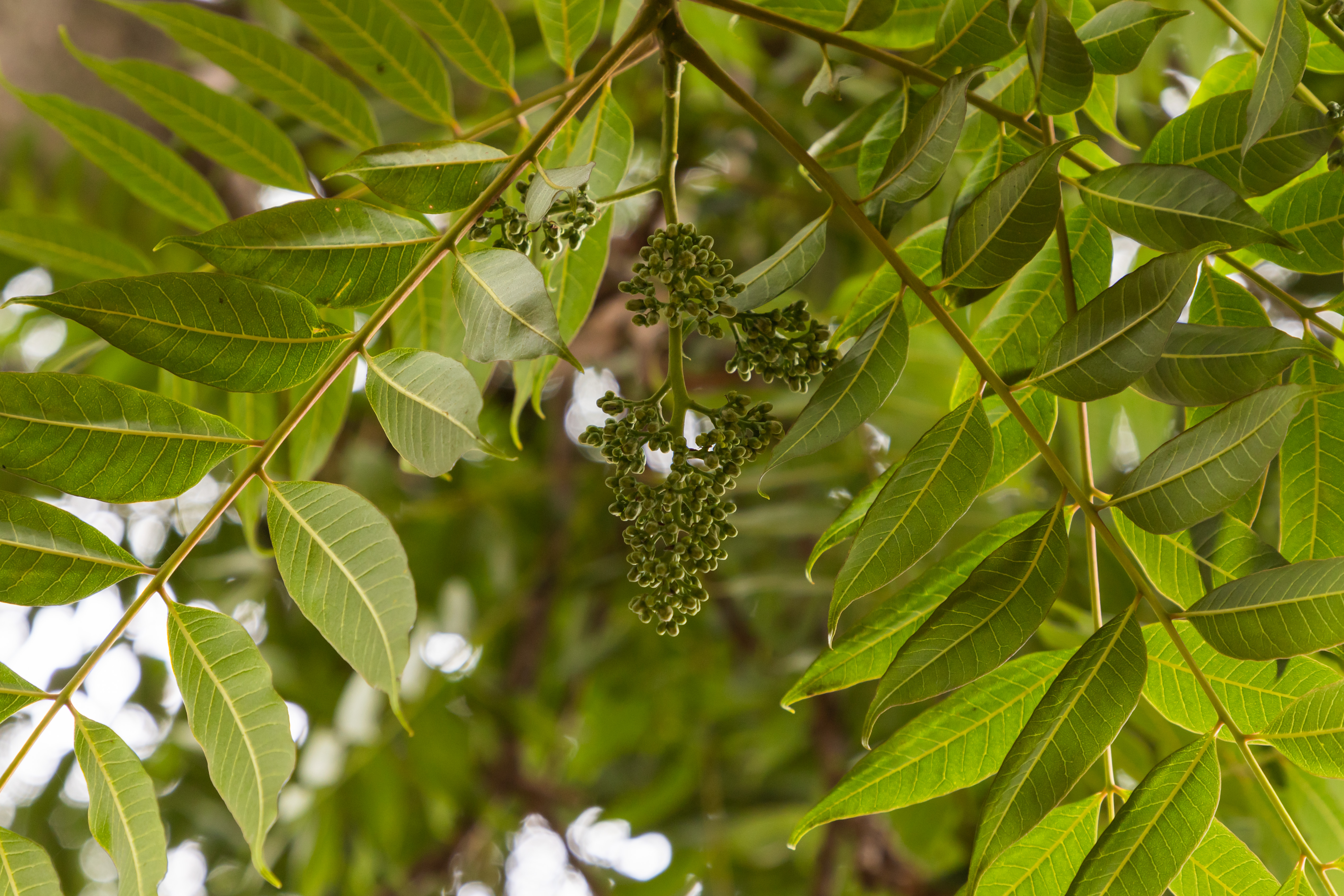
- Cedrela angustifolia leaves and inflorescence

Conservation status
- Endangered (IUCN 2.3)

Scientific classification
- Kingdom: Plantae
- Clade: Tracheophytes
- Clade: Angiosperms
- Clade: Eudicots
- Clade: Rosids
- Order: Sapindales
- Family: Meliaceae
- Genus: Cedrela
- Species: C. angustifolia

Binomial name
- Cedrela angustifolia Sessé & Moc. ex C.DC.

Synonyms
- Cedrela boliviana Rusby; Cedrela herrerae Harms; Cedrela lilloi C. DC.; Cedrela steinbachii Harms; Pterosiphon multivenius Turcz.; Surenus angustifolia (Sessé & Moc. ex DC.) Kuntze

= Cedrela angustifolia =

Species of tree

Cedrela angustifolia is a species of tree in the mahogany family, Meliaceae. Local common names include cedro de Tucumán, cedro bayo, cedro coya, and cedro del cerro. It is native to South America, where it occurs in Argentina, Bolivia and Peru.

This is a species of mountain forests. It easily colonizes disturbed habitat, forming dense canopy. These stands still occur in Bolivia, and the tree is common in parts of Argentina. However, it is a valuable timber tree. Some populations have faced substantial declines, and it is considered to be an endangered species.
