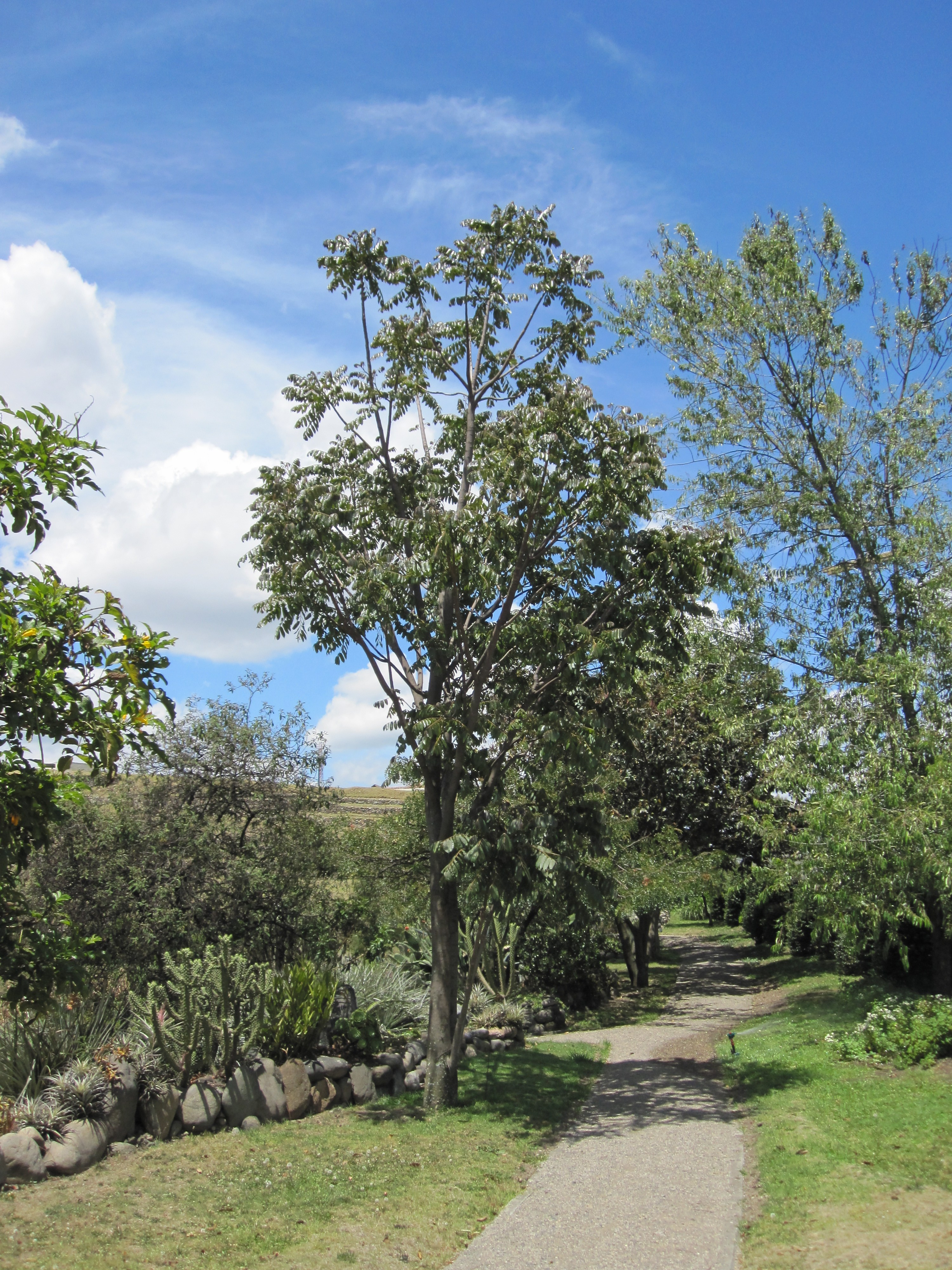

Scientific classification
- Kingdom: Plantae
- Clade: Tracheophytes
- Clade: Angiosperms
- Clade: Eudicots
- Clade: Rosids
- Order: Sapindales
- Family: Meliaceae
- Genus: Cedrela
- Species: C. montana

Binomial name
- Cedrela montana Moritz ex Turcz.

= Cedrela montana =

Species of tree

Cedrela montana is a species of tree in the family Meliaceae. It is found in the Andes of Venezuela, Colombia, Ecuador and Peru between 1050 and 3600 m altitude.

== Description ==
Trees up to 25 m tall rarely to 50 m tall, trunk with fissured bark. Imparipinnate leaves 20–55 cm long, with ovate-elliptic or ovate-oblong (sometimes oblong) leaflets. Inflorescences between 12 and 30 cm long, with small greenish-white to creamy flowers, fading to yellow, that grow in bunches. The largest individual, called "Cedro Gigante" in Pico Codazzi National Monument, eastern Venezuela is 47 m in height and a girth of 22 m with minor buttressing.

== Taxonomy ==
The Latin specific epithet montana refers to mountains or coming from mountains.
