= Tavilermide =

Chemical compound

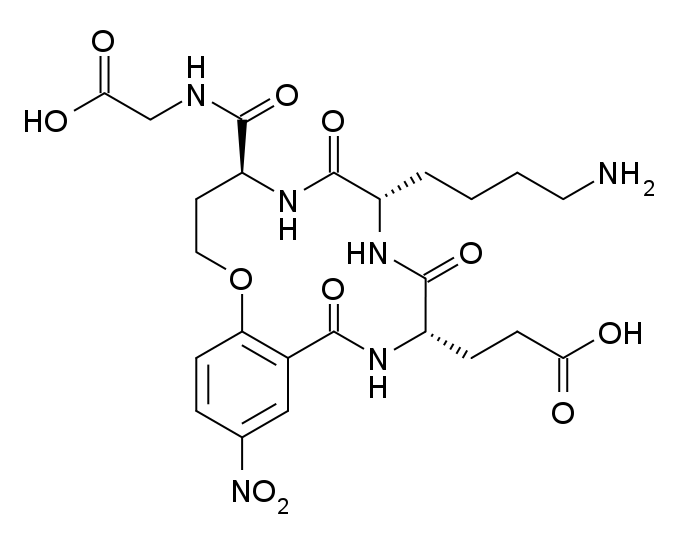

Clinical data
- Routes of administration: Eye drop
- ATC code: None

Identifiers
- IUPAC name: 3-[(5S,8S,11S)-8-(4-aminobutyl)-5-(carboxymethylcarbamoyl)-16-nitro-7,10,13-trioxo-2-oxa-6,9,12-triazabicyclo[12.4.0]octadeca-1(14),15,17-trien-11-yl]propanoic acid
- CAS Number: 263251-78-1
- PubChem CID: 9808372
- ChemSpider: 7984131
- UNII: NMG938VJ6T
- KEGG: D11226
- CompTox Dashboard (EPA): DTXSID00180937

Chemical and physical data
- Formula: C_{24}H_{32}N_{6}O_{11}
- Molar mass: 580.551 g·mol^{−1}
- 3D model (JSmol): Interactive image
- SMILES: NCCCC[C@@H]1NC(=O)[C@H](CCC(=O)O)NC(=O)c2cc([N+](=O)[O-])ccc2OCC[C@@H](C(=O)NCC(=O)O)NC1=O
- InChI: InChI=1S/C24H32N6O11/c25-9-2-1-3-15-23(37)29-17(22(36)26-12-20(33)34)8-10-41-18-6-4-13(30(39)40)11-14(18)21(35)27-16(24(38)28-15)5-7-19(31)32/h4,6,11,15-17H,1-3,5,7-10,12,25H2,(H,26,36)(H,27,35)(H,28,38)(H,29,37)(H,31,32)(H,33,34)/t15-,16-,17-/m0/s1; Key:DVJXNXPFYJIACK-ULQDDVLXSA-N

Tavilermide (INN; development code MIM-D3) is a selective, cyclic tripeptide partial agonist of TrkA. This class of drugs is sometimes referred to as nerve growth factor (NGF) mimetics. Tavilermide was first synthesized by Burgess and co-workers at Texas A&M University with the intention of producing TrkA agonists. It is under development by Mimetogen Pharmaceuticals as an ophthalmic (eye drop) solution for the treatment of dry eyes, and is in phase III clinical trials for this indication. Tavilermide is currently being evaluated in two multi-center phase III clinical studies in the United States for the treatment of dry eye disease. Tavilermide is also in phase I clinical trials for the treatment of glaucoma; studies are ongoing.

== See also ==
- Cenegermin
