= Deoxygedunin =

Chemical compound

Clinical data
- Other names: 14,15-Deoxygedunin
- ATC code: None

Identifiers
- IUPAC name: (1R,6R,7R,10R,11R,16R,18R)‐6‐(Furan‐3‐yl)‐1,7,11,15,15‐pentamethyl‐4,14‐dioxo‐5‐oxatetracyclo[8.8.0.0^{2,7}.0^{11,16}]octadeca‐2,12‐dien‐18‐yl acetate
- CAS Number: 21963-95-1
- PubChem CID: 23241800
- ChemSpider: 10341832
- UNII: Z8ANY33BM5
- CompTox Dashboard (EPA): DTXSID90631483

Chemical and physical data
- Formula: C_{28}H_{34}O_{6}
- Molar mass: 466.574 g·mol^{−1}
- 3D model (JSmol): Interactive image
- SMILES: CC(=O)OC1CC2C(C(=O)C=CC2(C3C1(C4=CC(=O)OC(C4(CC3)C)C5=COC=C5)C)C)(C)C
- InChI: InChI=1S/C28H34O6/c1-16(29)33-22-13-19-25(2,3)21(30)8-11-26(19,4)18-7-10-27(5)20(28(18,22)6)14-23(31)34-24(27)17-9-12-32-15-17/h8-9,11-12,14-15,18-19,22,24H,7,10,13H2,1-6H3; Key:VOUDTVRGPAGHGA-UHFFFAOYSA-N

Deoxygedunin, or 14,15-deoxygedunin, is a tetranortriterpenoid isolated from the Indian neem tree a plant that has been in traditional Indian medicine since ancient times as a remedy for various ailments.

== Pharmacology ==
Deoxygedunin has been found to act as a potent, selective, small-molecule agonist of TrkB, the main receptor of brain-derived neurotrophic factor (BDNF). It produces TrkB-dependent neurotrophic and neuroprotective effects in mice and enhances learning processes. In addition, deoxygedunin evokes rapid TrkB-dependent antidepressant-like effects in the forced swim test, an animal model of depression, similarly to 7,8-dihydroxyflavone (7,8-DHF) and ketamine, and notably with a greater potency than 7,8-DHF. The compound was discovered by the same group that identified 7,8-DHF and N-acetylserotonin as TrkB agonists.

== Research ==
With intraperitoneal injection to mice, deoxygedunin crosses the blood-brain-barrier into the central nervous system and possesses a long duration of action, with onset of action at 2 hours post-administration and peaking between 4–8 hours. Relative to 7,8-DHF, deoxygedunin has weaker binding affinity for TrkB (K_{d} = 1.4 μM). However, it is more potent than 7,8-DHF in vivo with intraperitoneal injection in multiple assays. Deoxygedunin has also been found to be orally and topically active. The compound, in contrast to 7,8-DHF, has poor water solubility, and hence its bioavailability, especially oral, may be suboptimal. The researchers who discovered deoxygedunin expressed that they were attempting to find analogues with improved water solubility that retained the biological activity of deoxygedunin, but, as of 2016, there appear to have been no subsequent reports on this effort since the original paper (2010) was published. They also stated in the paper that 7,8-DHF has a simpler chemical structure and that the flavonoids were easier to modify for improved biological effects than the gedunins.

Similarly to gedunin, a closely structurally related compound also found in Azadirachta indica, deoxygedunin has additionally been found to activate HSF1 and induce Hsp70, and was observed to possess neuroprotective effects in a model of Huntington's disease.

== See also ==
- Tropomyosin receptor kinase B § Agonists
