= Dihydroxyflavone =

Dihydroxyflavone may refer to:

- Chrysin (5,7-dihydroxyflavone)
- 4',7-Dihydroxyflavone
- 7,8-Dihydroxyflavone
