= Tripchlorolide =

Names
- Preferred IUPAC name (3bS,4aS,5aS,6R,7R,8R,8aR,9aS,9bS)-8-Chloro-6,7-dihydroxy-9b-methyl-7-(propan-2-yl)-3b,4,4a,5a,6,7,8,8a,9a,9b,10,11-dodecahydrobis(oxireno)[2′,3′:4b,5;2′′,3′′:8a,9]phenanthro[1,2-c]furan-1(3H)-one
- Other names Triptolide chlorhydrin; Triptolide 12,13-chlorhydrin

Identifiers
CAS Number	132368-08-2
3D model (JSmol)	Interactive image
ChemSpider	140317
PubChem CID	159588
CompTox Dashboard (EPA)	DTXSID80927645
- InChI: InChI=1S/C20H25ClO6/c1-8(2)18(24)13(21)14-20(27-14)17(3)5-4-9-10(7-25-15(9)22)11(17)6-12-19(20,26-12)16(18)23/h8,11-14,16,23-24H,4-7H2,1-3H3/t11-,12-,13+,14-,16+,17-,18-,19+,20+/m0/s1 Key: OIMACDABKWJVSQ-LZVGCMTRSA-N
- SMILES: CC(C)[C@@]1([C@@H]([C@H]2[C@@]3(O2)[C@]4(CCC5=C([C@@H]4C[C@H]6[C@]3([C@@H]1O)O6)COC5=O)C)Cl)O

Properties
Chemical formula	C_{20}H_{25}ClO_{6}
Molar mass	396.86 g·mol^{−1}
- Except where otherwise noted, data are given for materials in their standard state (at 25 °C [77 °F], 100 kPa). Infobox references

Tripchlorolide is an isolate of Tripterygium wilfordii (雷公藤) that has potential interaction with the NMDA receptor.
