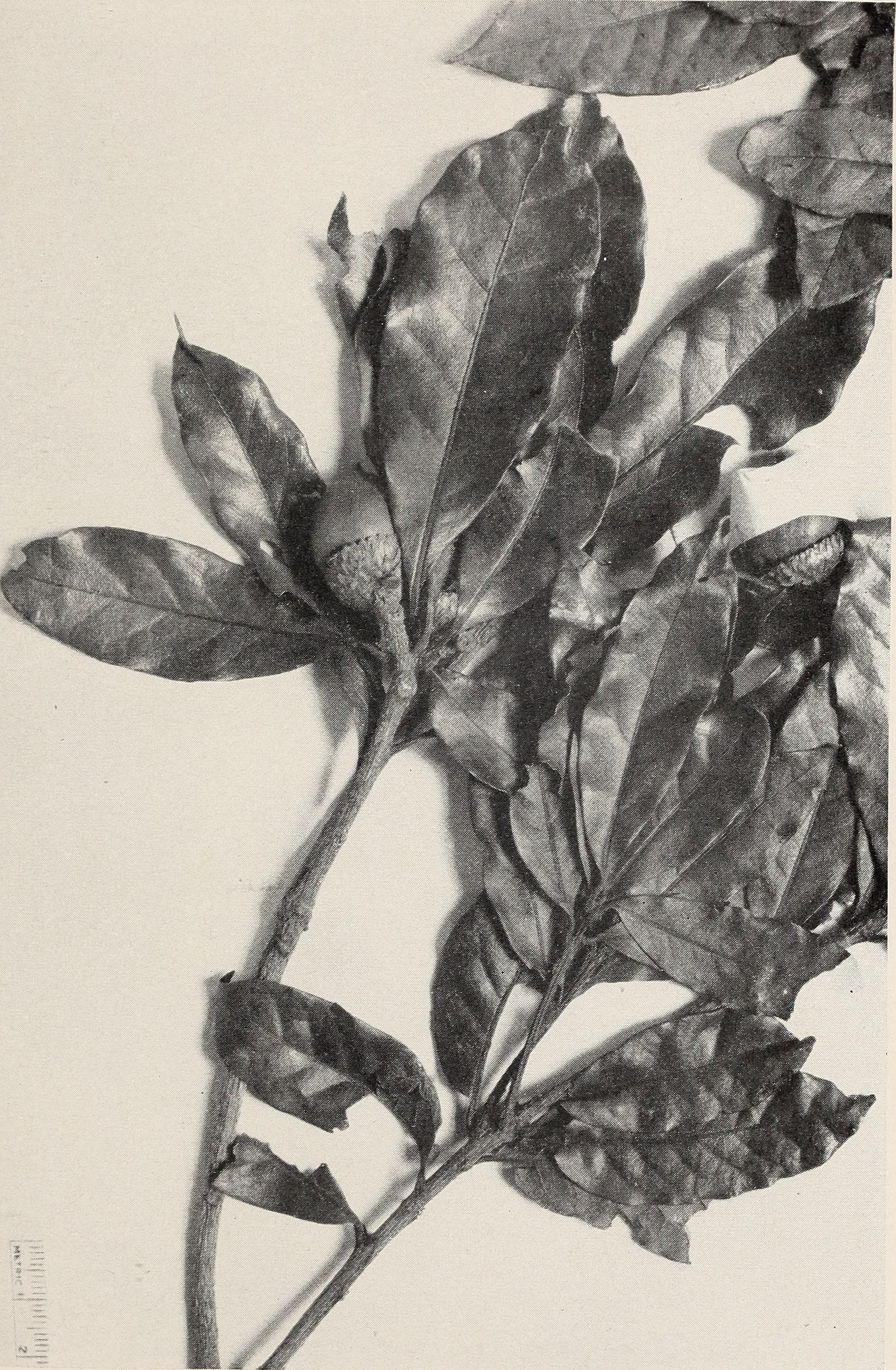

Scientific classification
- Kingdom: Plantae
- Clade: Embryophytes
- Clade: Tracheophytes
- Clade: Spermatophytes
- Clade: Angiosperms
- Clade: Eudicots
- Clade: Rosids
- Order: Fagales
- Family: Fagaceae
- Genus: Quercus
- Subgenus: Quercus subg. Quercus
- Section: Quercus sect. Lobatae
- Species: Q. tonduzii

Binomial name
- Quercus tonduzii Seemen

= Quercus tonduzii =

Species of oak tree

Quercus tonduzii is a species of oak. It is a tree endemic to central Costa Rica. It is placed in section Lobatae.
