= Adolphe Tonduz =

Swiss botanist (1862–1921)

Adolphe Tonduz (1862-1921) was a Swiss botanist who collected plants in both Guatemala and Costa Rica. He was the first director of the National Herbarium of Costa Rica, which was founded in 1887. Together with Henri Pittier he published 'Primitae Florae Costaricensis' and 'Herborisations au Costa Rica'.

== Honours and namesakes ==
=== Species named after Tonduz ===
These species were discovered from specimens collected by Tonduz and were unknown to science at the time.

- Acronia tonduzii
- Anemopaegma tonduzianum
- Anthurium tonduzii
- Calyptranthes tonduzii
- Cedrela tonduzii
- Quercus tonduzii
- Weberocereus tonduzii
