= Benzodrocortisone =

Chemical compound

Clinical data
- Other names: Hydrocortisone 17-benzoate; 11β,17α,21-Trihydroxypregn-4-ene-3,20-dione 17-benzoate; 17α-Benzoyloxypregn-4-ene-11α-ol-3,20-dione
- Drug class: Corticosteroid; Glucocorticoid

Identifiers
- IUPAC name: [(8S,9S,10R,11S,13S,14S,17R)-11-Hydroxy-17-(2-hydroxyacetyl)-10,13-dimethyl-3-oxo-2,6,7,8,9,11,12,14,15,16-decahydro-1H-cyclopenta[a]phenanthren-17-yl] benzoate
- CAS Number: 28956-89-0
- PubChem CID: 119845
- ChemSpider: 107004
- UNII: BCV386QGUZ
- CompTox Dashboard (EPA): DTXSID10951574

Chemical and physical data
- Formula: C_{28}H_{34}O_{6}
- Molar mass: 466.574 g·mol^{−1}
- 3D model (JSmol): Interactive image
- SMILES: C[C@]12CCC(=O)C=C1CC[C@@H]3[C@@H]2[C@H](C[C@]4([C@H]3CC[C@@]4(C(=O)CO)OC(=O)C5=CC=CC=C5)C)O
- InChI: InChI=1S/C28H34O6/c1-26-12-10-19(30)14-18(26)8-9-20-21-11-13-28(23(32)16-29,27(21,2)15-22(31)24(20)26)34-25(33)17-6-4-3-5-7-17/h3-7,14,20-22,24,29,31H,8-13,15-16H2,1-2H3/t20-,21-,22-,24+,26-,27-,28-/m0/s1; Key:LPEYMYDYPGRLBU-YGZHYJPASA-N

Benzodrocortisone, also known as hydrocortisone 17-benzoate, is a synthetic glucocorticoid corticosteroid which was assigned an INN in 2016, and has yet to be marketed.
