= Isofalcarintriol =

Names
- IUPAC name (3S,8R,9R,E)-Heptadeca-10-en-4,6-diyne-3,8,9-triol

Identifiers
CAS Number	2962060-53-1
3D model (JSmol)	Interactive image
ChemSpider	129393900
PubChem CID	169104130
- InChI: InChI=1S/C17H26O3/c1-3-5-6-7-8-9-13-16(19)17(20)14-11-10-12-15(18)4-2/h9,13,15-20H,3-8H2,1-2H3/b13-9+/t15-,16+,17+/m0/s1 Key: IIHWCRGLLODDFQ-RZBLDOIQSA-N
- SMILES: [C@H]([C@@H](/C=C/CCCCCC)O)(C#CC#C[C@H](CC)O)O

Properties
Chemical formula	C_{17}H_{26}O_{3}
Molar mass	278.392 g·mol^{−1}
- Except where otherwise noted, data are given for materials in their standard state (at 25 °C [77 °F], 100 kPa). Infobox references

Isofalcarintriol (IUPAC name (3S,8R,9R,E)-heptadeca-10-en-4,6-diyne-3,8,9-triol) is a polyacetylene contained in the root of carrots (Daucus carota).
