= LM11A-31 =

Experimental drug

Clinical data
- Other names: LM-11A-31; LM11A-31-BHS; LM11A31-BHS
- Routes of administration: Oral
- Drug class: p75NTR agonist

Legal status
- Legal status: Investigational

Identifiers
- IUPAC name: (2S,3S)-2-amino-3-methyl-N-(2-morpholin-4-ylethyl)pentanamide
- CAS Number: 102562-74-3 1243259-19-9 (HCl)
- PubChem CID: 18604758
- ChemSpider: 18560030
- UNII: Y9GUF3B7Q7
- CompTox Dashboard (EPA): DTXSID50595097

Chemical and physical data
- Formula: C_{12}H_{25}N_{3}O_{2}
- Molar mass: 243.351 g·mol^{−1}
- 3D model (JSmol): Interactive image
- SMILES: CC[C@H](C)[C@@H](C(=O)NCCN1CCOCC1)N
- InChI: InChI=1S/C12H25N3O2/c1-3-10(2)11(13)12(16)14-4-5-15-6-8-17-9-7-15/h10-11H,3-9,13H2,1-2H3,(H,14,16)/t10-,11-/m0/s1; Key:YNMUTYLWSRFTPX-QWRGUYRKSA-N

LM11A-31 is an experimental drug developed for Alzheimer's disease and Huntington's disease. It acts as an agonist of the p75 neurotrophin receptor (p75NTR).
