= Jiadifenolide =

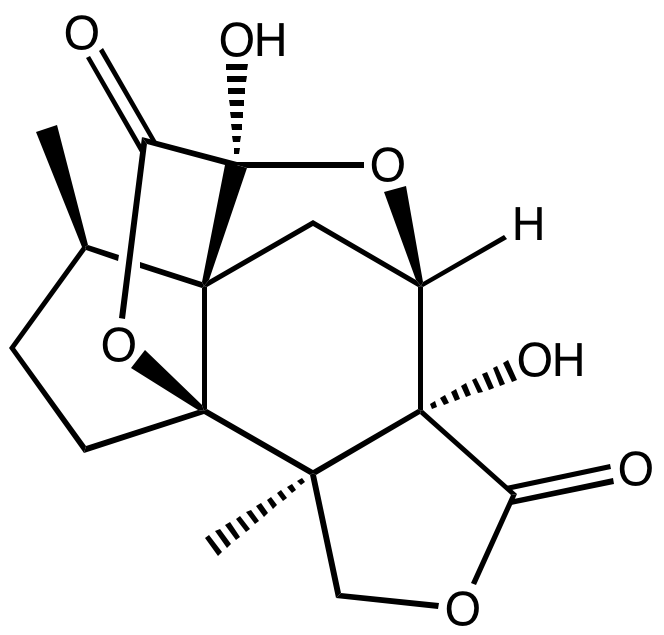

Names
- IUPAC name (1R,2R,6R,7R,9S,10R,11R)-6,9-Dihydroxy-2,11-dimethyl-4,8,14-trioxapentacyclo[7.4.2.1^{7,10}.0^{1,10}.0^{2,6}]hexadecane-5,15-dione

Identifiers
CAS Number	1193637-57-8
3D model (JSmol)	Interactive image
ChemSpider	28287016
PubChem CID	44542225
- InChI: InChI=1S/C15H18O7/c1-7-3-4-13-11(2)6-20-9(16)14(11,18)8-5-12(7,13)15(19,21-8)10(17)22-13/h7-8,18-19H,3-6H2,1-2H3/t7-,8-,11+,12-,13-,14-,15-/m1/s1 Key: YUHGKFNPDNMLHL-VNSIYCHCSA-N
- SMILES: O=C1OC[C@@]2(C)[C@@]3(OC4=O)[C@@]([C@H](C)CC3)([C@]4(O)O5)C[C@]5([H])[C@]21O

Properties
Chemical formula	C_{15}H_{18}O_{7}
Molar mass	310.302 g·mol^{−1}
- Except where otherwise noted, data are given for materials in their standard state (at 25 °C [77 °F], 100 kPa). Infobox references

Jiadifenolide is a sesquiterpenoid natural product with neurotrophic activity, found in Illicium jiadifengpi. Its biological activity and congested polycyclic structure have made it a popular target for total synthesis.

== Isolation and bioactivity ==
The seco-prezizaane-type sesquiterpenoid jiadifenolide was isolated in 2009 from the fruit of the flowering plant Illicium jiadifengpi. Chemical synthesis enabled preliminary assessment of its in vitro activity in promoting neurite outgrowth.

== Chemical synthesis ==
Jiadifenolide has been the subject of synthetic study in several academic labs.

The first total synthesis, reported in 2009, employed an asymmetric Robinson annulation and a translactonization reaction to construct the core of the molecule. Two further syntheses, a chiral-pool approach from (+)-pulegone and a racemic synthesis relying on a samarium diiodide–mediated reductive cyclization, were reported almost simultaneously in 2014. A second chiral-pool synthesis (from (+)-citronellal) reported in 2015 shortened the synthetic sequence, with a double Michael addition as the key transformation of eight steps, allowing the synthesis of gram-scale quantities of jiadifenolide.
