= Panaxytriol =

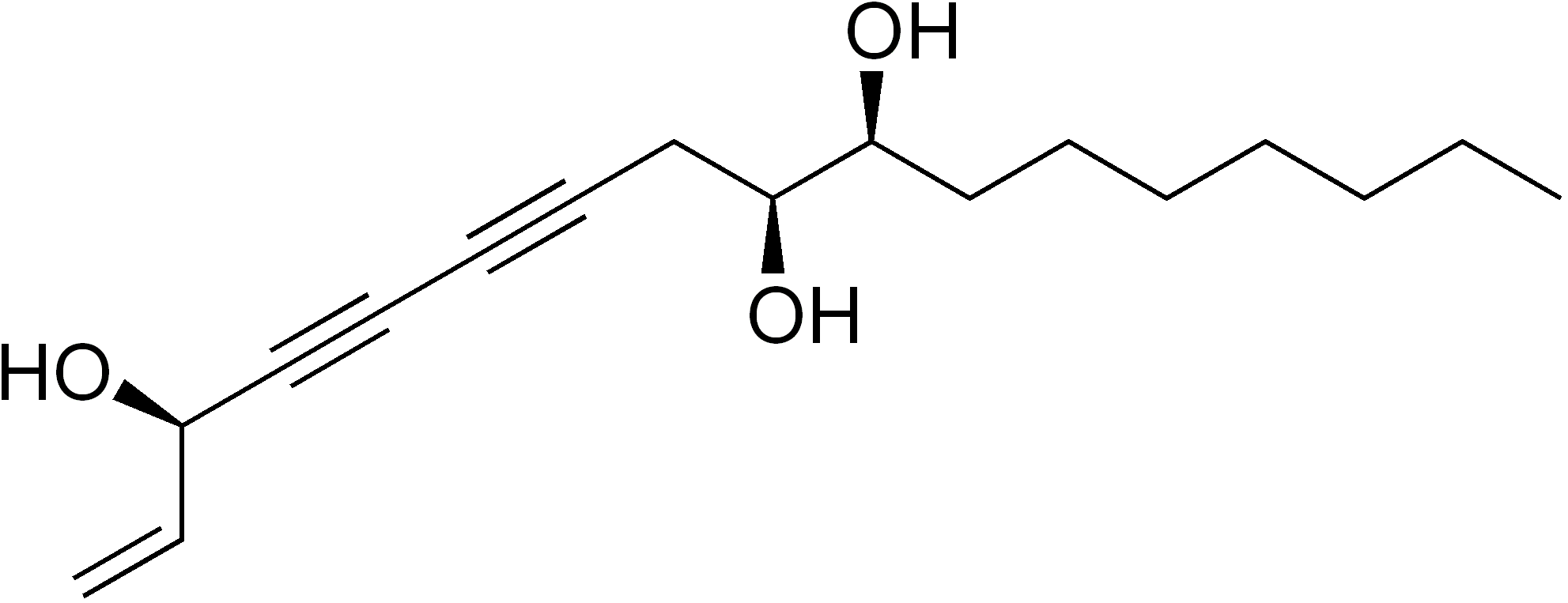

Names
- Preferred IUPAC name (3R,9S,10S)-Heptadec-1-ene-4,6-diyne-3,9,10-triol

Identifiers
CAS Number	87005-03-6
3D model (JSmol)	Interactive image
ChemSpider	9283802
PubChem CID	11108666
- InChI: InChI=1S/C17H26O3/c1-3-5-6-7-10-13-16(19)17(20)14-11-8-9-12-15(18)4-2/h4,15-20H,2-3,5-7,10,13-14H2,1H3/t15-,16+,17+/m1/s1 Key: RDIMTXDFGHNINN-IKGGRYGDSA-N
- SMILES: CCCCCCC[C@@H]([C@H](CC#CC#C[C@@H](C=C)O)O)O

Properties
Chemical formula	C_{17}H_{26}O_{3}
Molar mass	278.39 g/mol
- Except where otherwise noted, data are given for materials in their standard state (at 25 °C [77 °F], 100 kPa). verify (what is ?) Infobox references

Panaxytriol is an unsaturated fatty alcohol found in ginseng.
