= Intracerebral hemorrhage =

Type of intracranial bleeding that occurs within the brain tissue itself

- Other names: Cerebral haemorrhage, cerebral hemorrhage, intra-axial hemorrhage, cerebral hematoma, cerebral bleed, brain bleed, hemorrhagic stroke
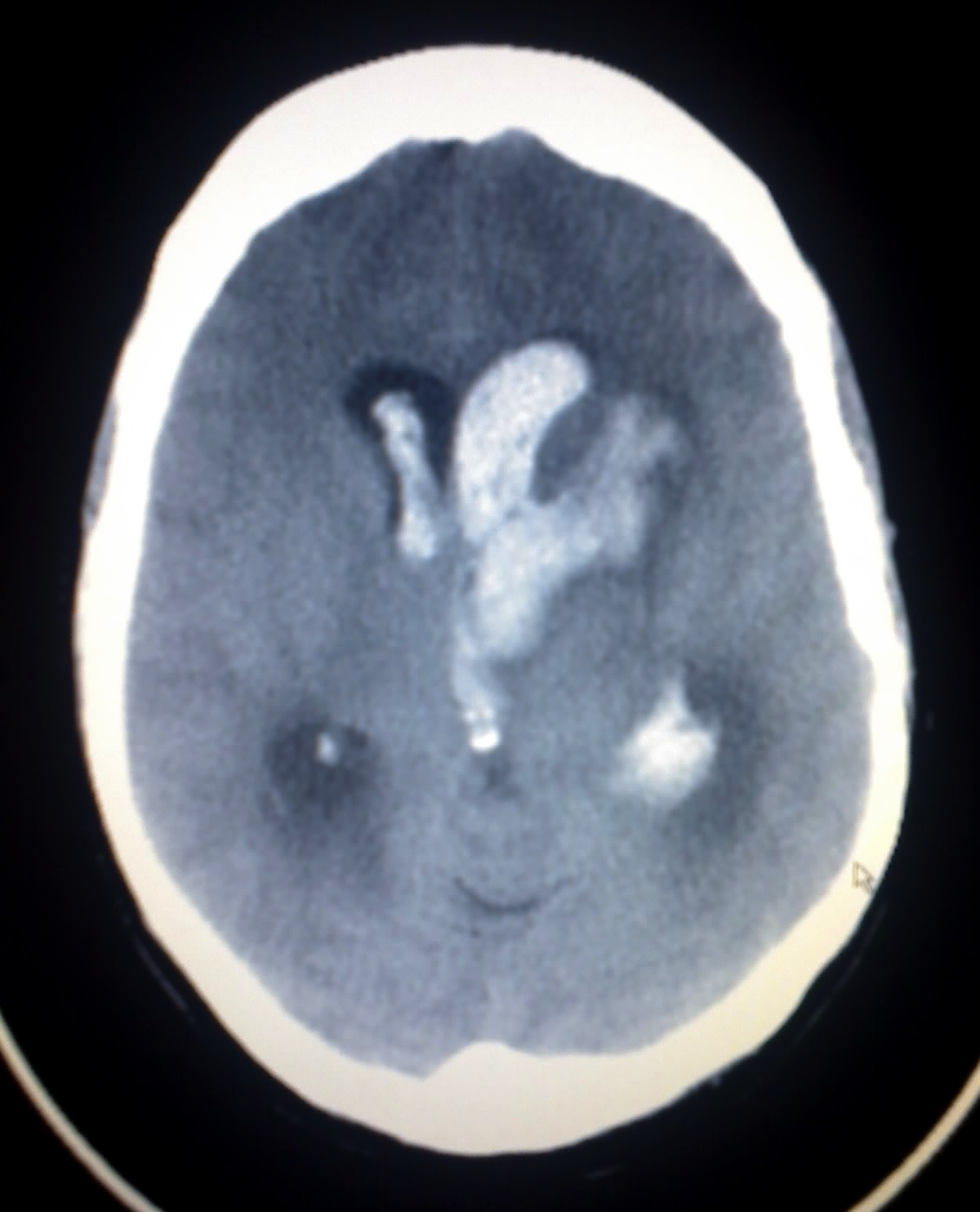
- CT scan of a spontaneous intracerebral bleed, leaking into the lateral ventricles
- Specialty: Neurosurgery, neurocritical care, emergency medicine
- Symptoms: Headache, one-sided numbness, weakness, tingling, or paralysis, speech problems, vision or hearing problems, dizziness or lightheadedness or vertigo, nausea/vomiting, seizures, decreased level or total loss of consciousness, neck stiffness, memory loss, attention and coordination problems, balance problems, fever, shortness of breath (when bleed is in the brain stem)
- Complications: Coma, persistent vegetative state, seizures, cardiac arrest (when bleeding is severe or in the brain stem), death
- Causes: Brain trauma, aneurysms, arteriovenous malformations, brain tumors, hemorrhagic conversion of ischemic stroke
- Risk factors: High blood pressure, diabetes, high cholesterol, amyloidosis, alcoholism, low cholesterol, blood thinners, cocaine use
- Diagnostic method: CT scan
- Differential diagnosis: Ischemic stroke
- Treatment: Blood pressure control, surgery, ventricular drain
- Prognosis: 20% good outcome
- Frequency: 2.5 per 10,000 people a year
- Deaths: 44% die within one month

Intracerebral hemorrhage (ICH), also known as hemorrhagic stroke, is a sudden bleeding into the tissues of the brain (i.e., the parenchyma), into its ventricles, or both. An ICH is a type of bleeding within the skull and a kind of stroke (ischemic stroke being the other). Symptoms can vary dramatically depending on the severity (i.e., how much blood), acuity (i.e., over what timeframe), and location (anatomically) but can include headache, one-sided weakness, numbness, tingling, or paralysis, speech problems, vision or hearing problems, memory loss, attention problems, coordination problems, balance problems, dizziness or lightheadedness or vertigo, nausea/vomiting, seizures, decreased level of consciousness or total loss of consciousness, neck stiffness, and fever.

Hemorrhagic stroke may occur on the background of alterations to the blood vessels in the brain, such as cerebral arteriolosclerosis, cerebral amyloid angiopathy, cerebral arteriovenous malformation, brain trauma, brain tumors, and an intracranial aneurysm, which can cause intraparenchymal or subarachnoid hemorrhage.

The biggest risk factors for spontaneous bleeding are high blood pressure and amyloidosis. Other risk factors include alcoholism, low cholesterol, blood thinners, and cocaine use. Diagnosis is typically by CT scan.

Treatment should typically be carried out in an intensive care unit due to strict blood pressure goals and frequent use of both pressors and antihypertensive agents. Anticoagulation should be reversed if possible and blood sugar kept in the normal range. A procedure to place an external ventricular drain may be used to treat hydrocephalus or increased intracranial pressure, however, the use of corticosteroids is frequently avoided. Sometimes surgery to directly remove the blood can be therapeutic.

Cerebral bleeding affects about 2.5 per 10,000 people each year. It occurs more often in males and older people. About 44% of those affected die within a month. A good outcome occurs in about 20% of those affected. Intracerebral hemorrhage, a type of hemorrhagic stroke, was first distinguished from ischemic strokes due to insufficient blood flow, so-called "leaks and plugs", in 1823.

== Epidemiology ==
The incidence of intracerebral hemorrhage is estimated at 24.6 cases per 100,000 person years with the incidence rate being similar in men and women. The incidence is much higher in the elderly, especially those who are 85 or older, who are 9.6 times more likely to have an intracerebral hemorrhage as compared to those of middle age. It accounts for 20% of all cases of cerebrovascular disease in the United States, behind cerebral thrombosis (40%) and cerebral embolism (30%).

== Types ==
=== Intraparenchymal hemorrhage ===
Intraparenchymal hemorrhage (IPH) is one form of intracerebral bleeding in which there is bleeding within brain parenchyma. Intraparenchymal hemorrhage accounts for approximately 8-13% of all strokes and results from a wide spectrum of disorders. It is more likely to result in death or major disability than ischemic stroke or subarachnoid hemorrhage, and therefore constitutes an immediate medical emergency. Intracerebral hemorrhages and accompanying edema may disrupt or compress adjacent brain tissue, leading to neurological dysfunction. Substantial displacement of brain parenchyma may cause elevation of intracranial pressure (ICP) and potentially fatal herniation syndromes.

=== Intraventricular hemorrhage ===
Intraventricular hemorrhage (IVH), also known as intraventricular bleeding, is a bleeding into the brain's ventricular system, where the cerebrospinal fluid is produced and circulates through towards the subarachnoid space. It can result from physical trauma or from hemorrhagic stroke.

30% of intraventricular hemorrhage (IVH) are primary, confined to the ventricular system and typically caused by intraventricular trauma, aneurysm, vascular malformations, or tumors, particularly of the choroid plexus. However 70% of IVH are secondary in nature, resulting from an expansion of an existing intraparenchymal or subarachnoid hemorrhage. Intraventricular hemorrhage has been found to occur in 35% of moderate to severe traumatic brain injuries. Thus the hemorrhage usually does not occur without extensive associated damage, and so the outcome is rarely good.

== Signs and symptoms ==
People with intracerebral bleeding have symptoms that correspond to the functions controlled by the area of the brain that is damaged by the bleed. These localizing signs and symptoms can include hemiplegia (or weakness localized to one side of the body) and paresthesia (loss of sensation) including hemisensory loss (if localized to one side of the body). These symptoms are usually rapid in onset, sometimes occurring in minutes, but not as rapid as the symptom onset in ischemic stroke. While the duration of onset may not be as rapid, it is important that patients go to the emergency department as soon as they notice any symptoms as early detection and management of stroke may lead to better outcomes post-stroke than delayed identification.

A mnemonic to remember the warning signs of stroke is FAST (facial droop, arm weakness, speech difficulty, and time to call emergency services), as advocated by the Department of Health (United Kingdom) and the Stroke Association, the American Stroke Association, the National Stroke Association (US), the Los Angeles Prehospital Stroke Screen (LAPSS) and the Cincinnati Prehospital Stroke Scale (CPSS). Use of these scales is recommended by professional guidelines. FAST is less reliable in the recognition of posterior circulation stroke.

Other symptoms include those that indicate a rise in intracranial pressure caused by a large mass (due to hematoma expansion) putting pressure on the brain. These symptoms include headaches, nausea, vomiting, a depressed level of consciousness, stupor and death. Continued elevation in the intracranial pressure and the accompanying mass effect may eventually cause brain herniation (when different parts of the brain are displaced or shifted to new areas in relation to the skull and surrounding dura mater supporting structures). Brain herniation is associated with hyperventilation, extensor rigidity, pupillary asymmetry, pyramidal signs, coma and death.

Hemorrhage into the basal ganglia or thalamus causes contralateral hemiplegia due to damage to the internal capsule. Other possible symptoms include gaze palsies or hemisensory loss. Intracerebral hemorrhage into the cerebellum may cause ataxia, vertigo, incoordination of limbs, and vomiting. Some cases of cerebellar hemorrhage lead to blockage of the fourth ventricle with subsequent impairment of drainage of cerebrospinal fluid from the brain. The ensuing hydrocephalus, or fluid buildup in the ventricles of the brain leads to a decreased level of consciousness, total loss of consciousness, coma, and persistent vegetative state. Brainstem hemorrhage most commonly occurs in the pons and is associated with shortness of breath, cranial nerve palsies, pinpoint (but reactive) pupils, gaze palsies, facial weakness, coma, and persistent vegetative state (if there is damage to the reticular activating system).

== Causes ==
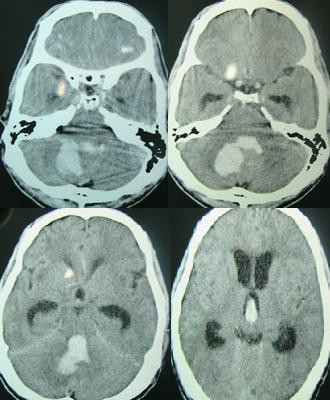
Axial CT scan showing hemorrhage in the posterior fossa

Intracerebral bleeds are the second most common cause of stroke, accounting for 10% of hospital admissions for stroke. High blood pressure raises the risks of spontaneous intracerebral hemorrhage by two to six times. More common in adults than in children, intraparenchymal bleeds are usually due to penetrating head trauma, but can also be due to depressed skull fractures. Acceleration-deceleration trauma, rupture of an aneurysm or arteriovenous malformation (AVM), and bleeding within a tumor are additional causes. Amyloid angiopathy is not an uncommon cause of intracerebral hemorrhage in patients over the age of 55. A very small proportion is due to cerebral venous sinus thrombosis.

Risk factors for ICH include:

- Hypertension (high blood pressure)
- Diabetes mellitus
- Menopause
- Excessive alcohol consumption
- Severe migraine

Hypertension is the strongest risk factor associated with intracerebral hemorrhage and long term control of elevated blood pressure has been shown to reduce the incidence of hemorrhage. Cerebral amyloid angiopathy, a disease characterized by deposition of amyloid beta peptides in the walls of the small blood vessels of the brain, leading to weakened blood vessel walls and an increased risk of bleeding; is also an important risk factor for the development of intracerebral hemorrhage. Other risk factors include advancing age (usually with a concomitant increase of cerebral amyloid angiopathy risk in the elderly), use of anticoagulants or antiplatelet medications, the presence of cerebral microbleeds, chronic kidney disease, and low low density lipoprotein (LDL) levels (usually below 70). The direct oral anticoagulants (DOACs) such as the factor Xa inhibitors or direct thrombin inhibitors are thought to have a lower risk of intracerebral hemorrhage as compared to the vitamin K antagonists such as warfarin.

Cigarette smoking may be a risk factor but the association is weak.

Traumatic intracerebral hematomas are divided into acute and delayed. Acute intracerebral hematomas occur at the time of the injury while delayed intracerebral hematomas have been reported from as early as 6 hours post injury to as long as several weeks.

== Diagnosis ==
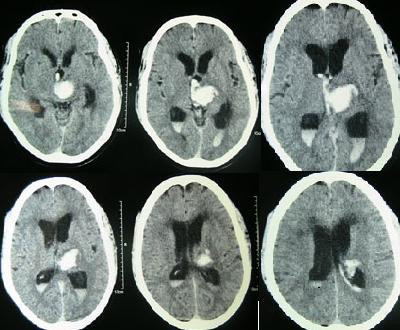
Spontaneous ICH with hydrocephalus on CT scan

Both computed tomography angiography (CTA) and magnetic resonance angiography (MRA) have been proved to be effective in diagnosing intracranial vascular malformations after ICH. So frequently, a CT angiogram will be performed in order to exclude a secondary cause of hemorrhage or to detect a "spot sign".

Intraparenchymal hemorrhage can be recognized on CT scans because blood appears brighter than other tissue and is separated from the inner table of the skull by brain tissue. The tissue surrounding a bleed is often less dense than the rest of the brain because of edema, and therefore shows up darker on the CT scan. The oedema surrounding the haemorrhage would rapidly increase in size in the first 48 hours, and reached its maximum extent at day 14. The bigger the size of the haematoma, the larger its surrounding oedema. Brain oedema formation is due to the breakdown of red blood cells, where haemoglobin and other contents of red blood cells are released. The release of these red blood cells contents causes toxic effect on the brain and causes brain oedema. Besides, the breaking down of blood-brain barrier also contributes to the odema formation.

Apart from CT scans, haematoma progression of intracerebral haemorrhage can be monitored using transcranial ultrasound. Ultrasound probe can be placed at the temporal lobe to estimate the volume of haematoma within the brain, thus identifying those with active bleeding for further intervention to stop the bleeding. Using ultrasound can also reduces radiation risk to the subject from CT scans.

=== Location ===
When due to high blood pressure, intracerebral hemorrhages typically occur in the putamen (50%) or thalamus (15%), cerebrum (10–20%), cerebellum (10–13%), pons (7–15%), or elsewhere in the brainstem (1–6%).

== Treatment ==
Treatment depends substantially on the type of ICH. Rapid CT scan and other diagnostic measures are used to determine proper treatment, which may include both medication and surgery.

- Tracheal intubation is indicated in people with a decreased level of consciousness or other risk of airway obstruction.
- IV fluids are given to maintain fluid balance, using isotonic rather than hypotonic fluids.

=== Medications ===
Rapid lowering of the blood pressure using antihypertensive therapy for those with hypertensive emergency can have higher functional recovery at 90 days post intracerebral haemorrhage, when compared to those who undergone other treatments such as mannitol administration, reversal of anticoagulation (those previously on anticoagulant treatment for other conditions), surgery to evacuate the haematoma, and standard rehabilitation care in hospital, while showing similar rate of death at 12%. Early lowering of the blood pressure can reduce the volume of the haematoma, but may not have any effect against the oedema surrounding the haematoma. Reducing the blood pressure rapidly does not cause brain ischemia in those who have intracerebral haemorrhage. The American Heart Association and American Stroke Association guidelines in 2015 recommended decreasing the blood pressure to a SBP of 140 mmHg. However, later reviews found unclear difference between intensive and less intensive blood pressure control.

Giving Factor VIIa within 4 hours limits the bleeding and formation of a hematoma. However, it also increases the risk of thromboembolism. It thus overall does not result in better outcomes in those without hemophilia.

Frozen plasma, vitamin K, protamine, or platelet transfusions may be given in case of a coagulopathy. Platelets, however, appear to worsen outcomes in those with spontaneous intracerebral bleeding on antiplatelet medication.

The specific reversal agents idarucizumab and andexanet alfa may be used to stop continued intracerebral hemorrhage in people taking directly oral-acting anticoagulants (such as factor Xa inhibitors or direct thrombin inhibitors). However, if these specialized medications are not available, prothrombin complex concentrate may also be used.

Only 7% of those with ICH present with clinical features of seizures, while up to 25% of those have subclinical seizures. Seizures are not associated with an increased risk of death or disability. Meanwhile, anticonvulsant administration can increase the risk of death. Therefore, anticonvulsants are only reserved for those that have shown obvious clinical features of seizures or seizure activity on electroencephalography (EEG).

H2 antagonists or proton pump inhibitors are commonly given to try to prevent stress ulcers, a condition linked with ICH.

Corticosteroids were thought to reduce swelling. However, in large controlled studies, corticosteroids have been found to increase mortality rates and are no longer recommended.

=== Surgery ===
Surgery is required if the hematoma is greater than 3 cm (1 in), if there is a structural vascular lesion or lobar hemorrhage in a young patient.

A catheter may be passed into the brain vasculature to close off or dilate blood vessels, avoiding invasive surgical procedures.

Aspiration by stereotactic surgery or endoscopic drainage may be used in basal ganglia hemorrhages, although successful reports are limited.

A craniectomy holds promise of reduced mortality, but the effects of long‐term neurological outcome remain controversial.

== Prognosis ==
About 8 to 33% of those with intracranial haemorrhage have neurological deterioration within the first 24 hours of hospital admission, with a large proportion of them happening within 6 to 12 hours. The rate of hematoma expansion, perihaematoma edema volume, and the presence of fever can affect the risk of neurological complications.

The risk of death from an intraparenchymal bleed in traumatic brain injury is especially high when the injury occurs in the brain stem. Intraparenchymal bleeds within the medulla oblongata are almost always fatal, because they cause damage to cranial nerve X, the vagus nerve, which plays an important role in blood circulation and breathing. This kind of hemorrhage can also occur in the cortex or subcortical areas, usually in the frontal or temporal lobes when due to head injury, and sometimes in the cerebellum. Larger volumes of hematoma at hospital admission as well as greater expansion of the hematoma on subsequent evaluation (usually occurring within 6 hours of symptom onset) are associated with a worse prognosis. Perihematomal edema, or secondary edema surrounding the hematoma, is associated with secondary brain injury, worsening neurological function, and poor outcomes. Intraventricular hemorrhage, or bleeding into the ventricles of the brain, which may occur in 30–50% of patients, is also associated with long-term disability and a poor prognosis. Brain herniation is associated with poor prognoses.

Predicting a patient's recovery after an intracerebral hemorrhage is difficult in the first few hours. Experts warn about a phenomenon known as a "self-fulfilling prophecy": this occurs when medical care is limited because a poor prognosis is assumed, leading to a patient's death due not only to the brain injury itself, but also to the lack of active treatment. To avoid this, major guidelines recommend waiting 24 to 72 hours before making final decisions about limiting life-sustaining treatment, except in cases of catastrophic brain injury. Even with these rules, data show that about 20% to 25% of patients still have their care limited very early on.

For spontaneous intracerebral hemorrhage seen on CT scan, the death rate (mortality) is 34–50% by 30 days after the injury, and half of the deaths occur in the first 2 days. Even though the majority of deaths occur in the first few days after ICH, survivors have a long-term excess mortality rate of 27% compared to the general population. Of those who survive an intracerebral hemorrhage, 12–39% are independent with regard to self-care; others are disabled to varying degrees and require supportive care.
