= Emergency Language Systems =

Emergency Language Systems, Inc.
- Type: Privately held company
- Industry: Book/software publisher in areas of emergency medical services, law enforcement, nursing
- Genre: Emergency medical services/medicine/language translation
- Founded: Berlin, Maryland, US (September 4, 2009)
- Founder: Jeff Dean, NREMT-Paramedic, Miguel Castañares, NREMT-Basic
- Area served: Worldwide
- Key people: Patricia Rivera, Hispanic entrepreneur and community leader, Big Vizion, musician
- Products: EMSpañol: Ambulance Edition ISBN 0-9825811-0-6, 32-page 8½" × 11" spiral bound, EMSpañol: Pocket Edition, ISBN 0-9825811-1-4, 40-page, 3½" × 6" saddlestitch, EMSpañol: Refusal of Care Forms for English or Spanish Speaking Patients, ISBN 0-9825811-2-2, two-part No-Carbon Required (NCR) forms, staple bound tablet, 8½" × 11". https://www.youtube.com/user/EmergencyLanguage
- Services: Translation services for EMS Refusal of Care Forms
- Owner: Jeff Dean, Miguel Castañares
- Subsidiaries: Partnership/Distribution through Southeastern Emergency Equipment, Wake Forest, North Carolina, http://www.seequip.com
- Website: emergencylanguage.com
- Footnotes; Emergency Language Systems is a Maryland S-Corporation and owns copyrights and trademarks for EMSpañol, POLICEspañol and NURSEpañol. Southeastern Emergency Equipment conducts business internationally.

Emergency Language Systems is a Maryland S-Corporation in the business of publishing Emergency Medical Services (EMS) language translation field guides. Emergency Language Systems maintains copyrights and trademarks for a series of books called EMSpañol. The company's founders are Jeff Dean, NREMT-Paramedic and Miguel Castañares, NREMT-Basic.

== Spanish for EMS: Contact Between EMS and Spanish Speaking Patients ==
The 2000 United States Census counted approximately 35 million Hispanics living in the United States. In 2007, the United States Census Bureau estimated the Hispanic population had grown to almost 45 million.

According to the U.S. Centers for Disease Control and Prevention (CDC), between 1992 and 2006 approximately 13 percent of all work-related injury deaths were Hispanic workers, a rate which exceeds those of other groups.

In 2006, the rate of work injury-related death was 25 percent higher in Hispanics compared to all workers. Foreign-born Hispanic workers had a higher rate of work-related injury deaths compared to native born Hispanic workers, and the largest portion of deaths among Hispanic workers occurred in the construction industry, which represented about a third of all such deaths. Since 1997, the most common causes of death have been highway incidents and falls to a lower level. Also the CDC reports that the number of falls as a cause of death increased 370 percent between 1992 and 2006.

The National Institutes of Health also report a disparity between the level of severity of illness or injury on first contact with emergency medical services between white and black/Hispanic patients, with black/Hispanic patients tending to wait longer into an illness or injury process to summons help.

== EMSpañol ==
Copyrights for EMSpañol: Ambulance Edition and EMSpañol: Pocket Edition are registered with the United States Copyright Office. The word EMSpañol is a trademark owned by Emergency Language Systems. EMSpañol books are printed in Salisbury, Maryland.

EMSpañol is a simple system for English-speaking EMS providers to assess and manage Spanish-speaking patients. EMSpañol uses simplified Spanish phrases to elicit as many yes/no and non-verbal answers as possible. EMSpañol follows standard EMS practice to assess Airway, Breathing and Circulation emergencies and make assessments throughout EMS' full scope of practice, including cardiac, respiratory, diabetic, OB/GYN and pediatric emergencies, the Rapid or pre-hospital trauma assessment, the Fibrinolytic Checklist and the Cincinnati Prehospital Stroke Scale. EMSpañol also includes a spelling and pronunciation chart and a labeled diagram of the body for the patient to indicate injured or painful areas by pointing.

== Bilingual Mass Casualty/Triage ==
The Newport Beach Fire Department of Newport Beach, California owns and maintains the standards governing the START (Simple Triage and Rapid Treatment) MCI Triage system used widely by EMS and fire companies in the United States. In 2009, The Newport Beach Fire Department granted permission to Emergency Language Systems to create an English-Spanish version of the START program, which is available free from either the Newport Beach Fire Department or Emergency Language Systems.

Dr. Lou Romig, of Miami, Florida owns and maintains the standards governing the JumpSTART (pediatric Simple Triage and Rapid Treatment) MCI Triage system used internationally by EMS and fire companies for mass casualty triage involving children. In 2009, Dr. Romig worked with Emergency Language Systems to create an English-Spanish version of the JumpSTART system, which is available free of charge from Dr. Romig or from Emergency Language Systems.

== Bilingual Refusal of Care Forms ==
The Maryland Institute of Emergency Services Systems (MIEMSS) is the governing body of Maryland EMS systems and providers. MIEMMS has used and maintained a standard EMS Refusal of Care Form in English since 1986, which is used whenever an EMS crew responds to a patient who then chooses not to be transported. The Maryland Form was originally written by the Maryland Attorney General's Office. In 2009, Emergency Language Systems made a Spanish translation of Maryland's English language Form, had that translation certified by Dianne Almond, a legal translator in the Maryland Circuit Court System, submitted the translation and certification to MIEMSS, who forwarded both to the Maryland Attorney General's Office, who then granted Emergency Language Systems copyright permission to distribute the bilingual Refusal of Care Form throughout the United States.

== Spanish for Paramedics and EMT's ==
EMS leaders in the United States use a combination of solutions to solve the EMS language barrier, including the use of written materials and field guides, teaching EMS providers to speak Spanish, using remote translation services (Language Line or other phone based interpreters), and the recruiting and hiring of bilingual providers. The Dallas Fire Department's Strategic Plan for 2008–2010 emphasizes the growing need for emergency providers to have Spanish language knowledge, and indicates the department's exploration of a Spanish Immersion program for its employees.
