= RobMedC =

Romanian-German paramedic and web video producer

- Born: Robert Constantin; 1997 or 1998; Romania
- Occupation: Paramedic

YouTube information
- Channel: RobMedC
- Years active: 2022–present
- Genres: Medicine, Education, Comedy
- Subscribers: 280 thousand
- Views: 260 million
- Last updated: 6 July 2025

Robert Constantin (born 1997 or 1998) known online as RobMedC, is a Romanian-German paramedic and web video producer, primarily known for publishing educational medical content with a comedic twist on YouTube and TikTok.

== Education and medical training ==
Constantin was born in Romania in either 1997 or 1998 and grew up in Fulda, where he attended the Winfriedschule. His interest in emergency medicine began during a first aid course at school, which led him to train as a school paramedic with the Malteser Hilfsdienst. He also volunteered as an event medic at various events. After earning his general university entrance qualification, he began a professional training program to become a paramedic at the German Red Cross in the Marburg region.

== Career as a web video creator ==
On 3 November 2022, Robert Constantin launched his YouTube channel RobMedC 🩺 where he began publishing comedic and simplified medical education content tailored for laypeople. He also shares similar videos on TikTok, Instagram, and Threads.

His topics include cardiopulmonary resuscitation (CPR), wound care, the BE-FAST criteria for stroke detection, and dealing with emergencies in everyday life. Many of his videos have been viewed millions of times. He emphasizes both the entertainment and the public health education value of his content, aiming to empower viewers to take action in emergency situations.

In his videos, he plays fictional characters such as "Robert" the paramedic, his colleague "Jürgen", and the apprentice "Mini-Jürgen".

== Public appearances and integration of roles ==
Robert Constantin frequently appears at trade fairs as a prominent web video creator and active paramedic. In 2024, for instance, he participated in the RETTmobil expo – the leading European trade fair for rescue services and mobility. There, he showcased his online educational content to a broader public audience.
