= Ischemic cascade =

Cascading failure of the vascular system

The ischemic (ischaemic) cascade is a series of biochemical reactions that are initiated in the brain and other aerobic tissues after seconds to minutes of ischemia (inadequate blood supply). This is typically secondary to stroke, injury, or cardiac arrest due to heart attack. Most ischemic neurons that die do so due to the activation of chemicals produced during and after ischemia. The ischemic cascade usually goes on for two to three hours but can last for days, even after normal blood flow returns.

== Mechanism ==
A cascade is a series of events in which one event triggers the next, in a linear fashion. Thus "ischemic cascade" is actually a misnomer, since the events are not always linear: in some cases they are circular, and sometimes one event can cause or be caused by multiple events. In addition, cells receiving different amounts of blood may go through different chemical processes. Despite these facts, the ischemic cascade can be generally characterized as follows:

1. Low blood supply decreases amount of oxygen that reaches tissues, leading to hypoxia
2. Deficiency of oxygen causes the neuron's normal process for making ATP for energy to fail.
3. The cell switches to anaerobic metabolism, producing lactic acid.
4. ATP-reliant ion transport pumps fail, causing the cell to become depolarized, allowing ions, including calcium (Ca^{2+}), to flow into the cell.
5. The ion pumps can no longer transport calcium out of the cell, and intracellular calcium levels get too high.
6. The presence of calcium triggers the release of the excitatory amino acid neurotransmitter glutamate.
7. Glutamate stimulates AMPA receptors and Ca^{2+}-permeable NMDA receptors, which open to allow more calcium into cells.
8. Excess calcium entry overexcites cells and causes the generation of harmful chemicals like free radicals, reactive oxygen species and calcium-dependent enzymes such as calpain, endonucleases, ATPases, and phospholipases in a process called excitotoxicity. Calcium can also cause the release of more glutamate.
9. As the cell's membrane is broken down by phospholipases, it becomes more permeable, and more ions and harmful chemicals flow into the cell.
10. Mitochondria break down, releasing toxins and apoptotic factors into the cell.
11. The caspase-dependent apoptosis cascade is initiated, causing cells to "commit suicide."
12. If the cell dies through necrosis, it releases glutamate and toxic chemicals into the environment around it. Toxins poison nearby neurons, and glutamate can overexcite them.
13. If and when the brain is reperfused, a number of factors lead to reperfusion injury.
14. An inflammatory response is mounted, and phagocytic cells engulf damaged but still viable tissue.
15. Harmful chemicals damage the blood–brain barrier.
16. Cerebral edema (swelling of the brain) occurs due to leakage of large molecules like albumins from blood vessels through the damaged blood brain barrier. These large molecules pull water into the brain tissue after them by osmosis. This "vasogenic edema" causes compression of and damage to brain tissue (Freye 2011; Acquired Mitochondropathy-A New Paradigm in Western Medicine Explaining Chronic Diseases).

== Mitigation of effects ==
The fact that the ischemic cascade involves a number of steps has led doctors to suspect that cerebroprotectants could be produced to interrupt the cascade at a single one of the steps, blocking the downstream effects. Over 150 cerebroprotectants have been tested in clinical trials, leading to the approval of tissue plasminogen activator (also known as tPA, t-PA, rtPA, Activase, or Alteplase or Actilyse) in the US and other countries, and edaravone (Radicut) in Japan.
