= Mailuoning =

Chinese herbs used after stroke

Mailuoning (Chinese: 脉络宁; pinyin: màiluòníng) is a compound based on herbs which is widely used in traditional Chinese medicine in an attempt to treat people who have had a stroke.

== Efficacy ==
There is no good evidence that Mailuoning is of any benefit in treating people who have had a stroke.

== Pharmacology ==
Mailuoning is a herbal compound made from extracts of:

- Dendrobium
- Scrophulariae Radix
- Flos Lonicerae
- Radix Achyranthis Bidentatae.

The principal bioactive substances are scoparone and ayapin.

== See also ==
- Acanthopanax
