= Stroke Association =

United Kingdom charity

- Founded: January 1, 1992
- Type: Charity
- Registration no.: England and Wales: 211015; Scotland: SC037789; Isle of Man: No 945; Jersey: No 221
- Purpose: To provide specialist support, fund critical research and campaign to make sure people affected by stroke get the very best care and support to rebuild their lives.
- Location(s): City Road; London, EC1; United Kingdom
- Region served: United Kingdom, Isle of Man and Guernsey
- Chief Executive: Juliet Bouverie OBE
- Revenue: £41.2 million (2021/22)
- Employees: 582
- Volunteers: 2,000
- Website: www.stroke.org.uk www.facebook.com/TheStrokeAssociation www.twitter.com/thestrokeassoc

The Stroke Association is a charity in the United Kingdom. It works to prevent stroke, and to support everyone touched by stroke, fund research, and campaign for the rights of stroke survivors of all ages.

== History ==
The Stroke Association was formed in 1992 out of the Chest, Heart and Stroke Association (CHASA), to focus exclusively on stroke. The preceding decades had seen the development of community based rehabilitation programs based on the work of Valerie Eaton Griffiths with actress Patricia Neal – wife of author Roald Dahl - following her series of severe strokes in the 1960s. Supported by the CHASA, these services became an increasingly significant part of their work until the charity decided to focus all of its attention and resources on stroke to become the Stroke Association.

Juliet Bouverie was appointed chief executive of the Stroke Association in June 2016. Juliet was awarded the Order of the British Empire Medal (OBE) in the Queen's 2020 New Years Honours list, for services to stroke survivors.

== Stroke Support services ==
The Stroke Association provides a wide range of Stroke Support services to meet the needs of stroke survivors and carers across the UK. Services include the Stroke Recovery Service, Communication Support Service, Emotional Support Service, Exercise-based Rehabilitation Service, Post Stroke Review service, and Caring and You; which helped over 58,000 stroke survivors across the UK in 2016–17. These services operate in England (including the Isle of Man and Jersey), Wales, and Northern Ireland.

== Research ==
Stroke Association funds research into stroke prevention, treatment and after-care in the UK. Since 1991 it has invested over £55 million on vital stroke research. Research funded by Stroke Association has the ultimate aim of making stroke a preventable and treatable disease, and improving the quality of life for people affected by stroke. A list of research projects funded by the organisation is available on the Stroke Association website.

The findings from research are crucial in the search for new ways to prevent a stroke happening, find new or improve existing treatments for those people who have a stroke, and understand how the brain works and changes after a stroke.

The evidence about treatments and therapies that comes from research also helps doctors, nurses and other health and social care professionals to convince commissioners to provide appropriate and effective services to help the 150,000 people in the UK who have a stroke each year.

Research by Professor Keith Muir at the University of Glasgow is working to improve thrombolytic research with funding from the charity. In 2011, they funded research into boosting the natural brain repair process to limit post-stroke disability. This was led by Professor Lalit Kalra of King's College London.

== Prevention ==
The charity campaigns to support primary and secondary stroke prevention.

=== FAST ===
The charity is working in partnership with the Department of Health (United Kingdom) on its Act FAST campaign, which was launched in 2009 and supported by national TV advertisements. The FAST (stroke) campaign informs the public on how to use a test to recognize stroke symptoms quickly. FAST is an acronym for Facial weakness, Arm weakness, Speech problems and Time to call 999.

=== Know Your Blood Pressure ===
The Stroke Association ran the "Know Your Blood Pressure" (KYBP) campaign with its partners Rotary International, the Emergency Medical Services, and St. Andrew's First Aid to offer free blood-pressure testing to members of the public. KYBP also encouraged the public to organize independent blood-pressure testing events.

== Other activities ==
=== Life After Stroke Awards ===
The Life After Stroke Awards is an annual award ceremony that celebrates the achievements of stroke survivors, their families, carers, healthcare professionals and supporters. The event has received support from celebrities including Chris Tarrant, Bruce Forsyth, Gail Porter, Neil Fox, and Lynda Bellingham.

=== Publications ===
Stroke News is the charity's magazine aimed at stroke patients and the health professionals who work with them. The Stroke Association also produce a range of patient-centred and awareness-raising leaflets and fact sheets.

=== Conferences and events ===
The Stroke Association hosts the UK Stroke Forum – a coalition of 32 organisations committed to improving stroke care. The forum is the largest multidisciplinary stroke conference in the UK where stroke clinicians and researchers share ideas, promote research and provide a unified voice for more statutory sector funding for research.

The charity host the UK Stroke Assembly, an event attended by stroke survivors, carers, stroke charities and researchers.

=== SAFE ===
The Stroke Association has held the Secretariat of the pan-European patient representative organisation Stroke Action For Europe since its inception in 2004. SAFE consists of 22 patient groups across Europe. SAFE exists to promote awareness and prevention of stroke, increase the priority given to stroke by policy and decision-makers in the EU, and “co-ordinate the efforts of national stroke patient groups in Europe”.

=== Stroke Awareness Month ===
The Stroke Association supports Stroke Awareness Month every May.

== Fundraising ==
The Stroke Association has a number of flagship annual fundraising events, as well as taking part in independent provider's events, such as the London Marathon.

=== Resolution Run ===
The Stroke Association's UK-wide Resolution Runs encourage people to make running their resolution for the New Year.

=== Give a Hand and Bake ===
Give a Hand and Bake is an annual baking week held each October. Friends, families and communities come together to host bake sales to raise funds.

== Awards ==
The charity has won and been shortlisted for a number of notable awards, including:

- Finalist, Third Sector Awards (2009), ‘Big Impact’ and ‘Social Enterprise’
- Finalist, Britain's Best Charity (2008)
- Finalist, Britain's Best Charity (2007)
- Winner, UK Charity Awards (2006), ‘Healthcare and Medical Research’
- Finalist, The Running Awards (2017), 'Large Charity'
- Bronze, The Running Awards (2017), 'Event Series' for Resolution Runs
- Finalist, Better Society Awards (2020), 'Partnership with a Health Charity' with ISS UK
