= Insult (medical) =

Cause of physical or mental injury

In medical terms, an insult is the cause of some kind of physical or mental injury. For example, a burn on the skin (the injury) may be the result of a thermal, chemical, radioactive, or electrical event (the insult). Likewise, sepsis and trauma are examples of foreign insults, and encephalitis, multiple sclerosis, and brain tumors are examples of insults to the brain. Clinicians may use the term cerebrovascular insult (CVI) as a synonym for a stroke.

Insults may be categorized as either genetic or environmental.
