= Post-stroke depression =

Depression caused by a stroke

- A stroke of the middle cerebral artery can cause post-stroke depression
- Specialty: Neurology, psychiatry
- Usual onset: After a stroke: acute, subacute, or chronically
- Causes: Stroke of the anterior brain or the basal ganglia
- Treatment: Cognitive behavioral therapy, antidepressant medications
- Frequency: 18-33% of stroke survivors

Post-stroke depression (PSD) is a form of depression that may occur after a stroke. PSD significantly impacts stroke recovery and the overall quality of life of those affected. It is particularly associated with strokes affecting the basal ganglia or the anterior regions of the brain, including the hippocampus and prefrontal cortex. Treatment can include medications such as SSRIs, SNRIs, tricyclic antidepressants, and/or cognitive behavioral therapy.

== Symptoms and signs ==
Symptoms of post-stroke depression are the same as those of major depression. The severity and symptoms vary from person to person, but definitionally and most commonly involve a depressed mood and/or an overall loss of interest or pleasure in activities. The classically defined symptoms of depression, which may be present in varying severity and number, are:

1. Down, sad, or depressed mood
2. Anhedonia (loss of interest or pleasure)
3. Insomnia or hypersomnia
4. Tiredness, fatigue, or lack of energy
5. Loss of appetite or excessive appetite
6. Guilt or self-loathing
7. Difficulty concentrating
8. Psychomotor agitation or psychomotor retardation
9. Feeling hopeless, thoughts of death or dying, or thoughts of self-harm or suicide

== Incidence and risk factors ==
PSD has a reported incidence of 18% to 33%, though it is commonly underdiagnosed due to overlapping symptoms between stroke and depression. A comprehensive meta-analysis found that over half of stroke patients experience at least one episode of depression. Various risk factors increase the likelihood of developing PSD, including:

- Female sex
- Prior history of mental illness, especially pre-stroke depression
- Suffering from large or multiple strokes
- Anterior or basal ganglia region strokes
- Diffuse white matter damage
- Higher levels of post-stroke disability

Location, size, overall severity, and impact on cognitive function of a stroke may better predict the likelihood of post-stroke depression than other risk factors.

== Pathogenesis ==
The exact mechanisms behind PSD are not completely understood, as the condition results from a complex interplay of neurochemical, structural, and inflammatory disruptions of brain function. In particular, the function of the limbic system, which is commonly implicated in major depressive disorder, may be disrupted either directly or indirectly by a stroke. Key mechanisms implicated in PSD include glutamate toxicity, HPA axis dysfunction, abnormal neurotrophic response, decreased monoamine levels.

Collectively, these mechanisms are most pronounced in the frontal lobes, hippocampus, limbic system, and basal ganglia. Strokes affecting these regions of the brain are thus more likely to cause PSD. Some evidence also suggests that strokes of the left side of the brain are more commonly associated with PSD, and with greater severity, than the right; this is the classically accepted view. However, other studies have found no association between left or right side and PSD, or have even identified the right side as being more closely linked to PSD.

=== Glutamate toxicity ===
Glutamate is an excitatory neurotransmitter that, in excessive amounts, causes excitotoxicity by promoting calcium influx into neurons. This influx can lead to neuronal death, contributing to brain damage of the emotional regulation and reward pathways in the prefrontal cortex, amygdala, and especially the hippocampus. Damage to these brain structures can lead to the development of depression.

=== HPA axis dysregulation ===
The hypothalamic-pituitary-adrenal (HPA) axis is responsible for regulating stress responses. HPA axis dysfunction is associated with both sustained elevation of glucocorticoid levels and chronic inflammation, both of which are associated with major depressive disorder. Dysregulation of the HPA axis can perpetuate a cycle of neuroinflammation that exacerbates depressive symptoms.

=== Abnormal neurotrophic response ===
Neurotrophic factors, which support the growth, maturation, and survival of neurons, are impaired in PSD. This disruption particularly affects the hippocampus and prefrontal cortex, leading to diminished neurogenesis and neuroplasticity, which are critical for emotional regulation and cognitive function.

=== Lower monoamine levels ===
PSD is associated with decreased levels of monoamine neurotransmitters such as serotonin, dopamine, and norepinephrine. These neurotransmitters are vital for mood regulation, cognitive functions, and the brain's reward system. Lower levels in the frontal cortex and limbic system contribute to depression seen in PSD and in patients with other forms of depression.

== Screening and diagnosis ==
Screening for PSD should be a standard, routine, and repeated part of post-stroke care, with tools like the Hamilton Depression Rating Scale (HDRS) and the Patient Health Questionnaire-9 (PHQ-9) recommended for this purpose; there is no consensus on a single screening tool to use, and some experts recommend using two different scales before establishing a diagnosis, to reduce the risk of a false positive result.

Diagnosis is clinical, and can be established in any patient who develops sustained depressive symptoms after a stroke. While these criteria can appear simple, diagnosis may be challenging due to the overlap between stroke-related neurological symptoms and depression, which can present with or without a typical depressed mood. Additionally, sensory and cognitive impairments seen in many stroke patients may complicate mental health assessments.

=== Differentiating from post-stroke apathy ===
It is essential to differentiate PSD from post-stroke apathy (PSA). While PSA involves diminished goal-directed behavior and a lack of spontaneous movement or speech, it does not encompass low mood, thoughts of death or suicide, or feelings of guilt and worthlessness, which are associated with depression. Neurologically, PSA is more associated with extensive white matter degeneration than PSD.

== Treatment ==
Treatment strategies for PSD typically involve one or both of the following.

- Medications: Selective serotonin reuptake inhibitors (SSRIs), serotonin-norepinephrine reuptake inhibitors (SNRIs), and tricyclic antidepressants (TCAs) have shown efficacy in managing PSD.
- Cognitive Behavioral Therapy (CBT): Although CBT has demonstrated benefits in PSD patients, stroke-related symptoms such as aphasia or physical limitations may hinder or prevent active participation in therapy sessions.

Some, but not all, sources recommend the prophylactic use of antidepressant medications (primarily SSRIs and SNRIs) in patients with strokes considered to be high risk for PSD.

== Outlook ==
Patients with post-stroke depression have higher rates of mortality and decreased baseline cognitive function compared to non-depressed stroke patients. However, both of these consequences can be significantly improved with antidepressants such as SSRIs.

Disability remains a challenge for many stroke patients, and PSD can worsen medical problems that cause disability. Like cognitive function, other disabling impairments may be significantly lessened among patients prescribed SSRIs or other antidepressants.
