= Los Angeles Prehospital Stroke Screen =

Los Angeles Prehospital Stroke Screen (LAPSS)
- Synonyms: LAPSS
- Purpose: identifying potential stroke patients

The Los Angeles Prehospital Stroke Screen (abbreviated LAPSS) is a method of identifying potential stroke patients in a pre-hospital setting.

== Screening criteria ==
- No history of seizures or epilepsy
- Age 45 years or older
- At baseline, patient is not bedridden and does not use a wheelchair
- Blood glucose between 60 and 400 mg/dL
- Obvious asymmetry-unilateral weakness with any of the following motor exams:
  1. Facial Smile/Grimace
  2. Grip
  3. Arm Strength

If all of the above criteria are met (or not ascertainable) the LAPSS is positive for stroke. Patients may still be experiencing a stroke even if LAPSS criteria are not met.

== Validity ==
A January 2000 study, conducted by 3 teams of Los Angeles-based paramedic units resulted in "sensitivity of 91% (95% CI, 76% to 98%), specificity of 97% (95% CI, 93% to 99%), positive predictive value of 86% (95% CI, 70% to 95%), and negative predictive value of 98% (95% CI, 95% to 99%). With correction for the 4 documentation errors, positive predictive value increased to 97% (95% CI, 84% to 99%)."

In a Chinese study, Beijing paramedics using the protocol, completed LAPSS screenings in an average of 4.3±3.0 minutes (median, 5 minutes). The study resulted in a sensitivity of 78.44% and a specificity of 90.22%.

== See also ==
- FAST (stroke)
- Cincinnati Prehospital Stroke Scale
