= Blood–brain barrier disruption =

Blood–brain barrier disruption is the surgical process whereby drugs are used to create openings between cells in the blood–brain barrier.

== Purpose ==
The blood–brain barrier (BBB) is protected by a network of blood vessels and tissue that shields it from harmful substances. This protection also stops anti-cancer drugs from getting to the brain. To treat brain tumours and other brain related diseases, blood–brain barrier disruption is needed for the anti-cancer drugs to be infused into an artery that goes to the brain.

== Effects ==
Studies have shown that blood–brain barrier disruption can cause diseases in the central nervous system.
