= Cincinnati Prehospital Stroke Scale =

Pre-hospital diagnostic test for stroke

- Purpose: diagnose a potential stroke

The Cincinnati Prehospital Stroke Scale (abbreviated CPSS) is a system used to diagnose a potential stroke in a prehospital setting. It tests three signs for abnormal findings which may indicate that the patient is having a stroke. If any one of the three tests shows abnormal findings, the patient may be having a stroke and should be transported to a hospital as soon as possible. The CPSS was derived from the National Institutes of Health Stroke Scale and developed in 1997 at the University of Cincinnati Medical Center for prehospital use.

== Method ==
1. Facial droop: Have the person smile or show his or her teeth. If one side doesn't move as well as the other so it seems to droop, that could be a sign of a stroke.
  - Normal: Both sides of face move equally
  - Abnormal: One side of face does not move as well as the other (or at all)
2. Arm drift: Have the person close his or her eyes and hold his or her arms straight out in front with palms facing up for about 10 seconds. If one arm does not raise, or one arm winds up drifting down more than the other, that could be a sign of a stroke.
  - Normal: Both arms move equally or not at all
  - Abnormal: One arm does not raise or one arm drifts down compared to the other side
3. Speech: Have the person say, "You can't teach an old dog new tricks," or some other simple, familiar saying. If the person slurs the words, gets some words wrong, or is unable to speak, that could be a sign of a stroke.
  - Normal: Patient uses correct words with no slurring
  - Abnormal: No speech, slurred speech, or inappropriate (incorrect) words

Patients with 1 of these 3 findings as a new event have a 72% probability of an ischemic stroke. If all 3 findings are present the probability of an acute stroke is more than 85%.

== See also ==
- Los Angeles Prehospital Stroke Screen (LAPSS)
- FAST (acronym)
