= FAST (stroke) =

Medical mnemonic of stroke symptoms

FDA infographic teaching the FAST mnemonic

FAST is an acronym used as a mnemonic device to help early recognition and detection of the signs and symptoms of a stroke. The acronym stands for Facial drooping, Arm (or leg) weakness, Speech difficulties and Time to call emergency services.

- F - Facial drooping - A section of the face, usually only on one side, that is drooping and hard to move. This can be recognized by a crooked smile, or difficulty preventing saliva from leaking at a corner of the mouth.
- A - Arm (or leg) weakness - Inability to raise one's arm fully, or the inability to hold or squeeze something (such as someone's hand), or a new reduction in strength of an arm or leg when raising/supporting an extra weight (such as new difficulty of carrying/lifting a typical object, or raising one's body from squatting/sitting position).
- S - Speech difficulties - An inability or difficulty to understand or produce speech, slurred speech, or having difficulty repeating even a basic sentence such as "The sky is blue".
- T - Time - If any of the symptoms above are showing, time is of the essence; emergency medical services should be called and/or the person taken to a hospital immediately if possible. It is also important to note the time the symptoms first started appearing and pass on this information ("Time is brain").

== History ==
The FAST acronym was developed in the UK in 1998 by a group of stroke physicians, ambulance personnel, and an emergency department physician and was designed to be an integral part of a training package for ambulance staff. The acronym was created to expedite administration of intravenous tissue plasminogen activator to patients within 3 hours of acute stroke symptom onset. The instruments at this time with most evidence of validity were the Cincinnati Prehospital Stroke Scale (CPSS) and the Los Angeles Prehospital Stroke Screen (LAPSS).

Studies using FAST have demonstrated variable diagnostic accuracy of strokes by paramedics and emergency medical technicians with positive predictive values between 64% and 77%.

The alternative acronym BE-FAST has shown promise by capturing >95% of ischemic strokes; however, adding coordination and diplopia assessment did not improve stroke detection in the prehospital setting.

== Alternative versions ==
BE-FAST has shown promise and is currently being studied as an alternative method to the FAST acronym.

- B - balance degradation - increase in difficulty of maintaining balance while walking (especially when using stairs or changing direction), or standing (especially when standing on one foot); now needing assistance using a hand on something such as a hand-rail or cane.
- E - eyesight degradation within a continuous period of consciousness (less than 12 hours), such as greater difficulty focusing on detail of an object or discerning low-contrast detail.

The other components are as for the classic FAST mnemonic.

- F - Face
- A - Arm
- S - Speech
- T - Time

FASTER is used by Beaumont Health.

- F - Face - Facial drooping or numbness on one side of the face
- A - Arms - Arm weakness on one side of the body
- S - Stability - Inability to maintain balance and stay steady on one's feet; dizziness
- T - Talking - Slurred speech, inability to respond coherently, or other speech difficulty
- E - Eyes - Changes in vision, including seeing double, or partial or complete blindness in one or both eyes
- R - React - Call emergency services immediately if you see any of these symptoms, even if symptoms go away
