= Cranial nerve disease =

Impaired functioning of one of the twelve cranial nerves

- Cranial nerves
- Specialty: Neurology

Cranial nerve disease is an impaired functioning of one of the twelve cranial nerves. Although it could theoretically be considered a mononeuropathy, it is not considered as such under MeSH.

It is possible for a disorder of more than one cranial nerve to occur at the same time, if a trauma occurs at a location where many cranial nerves run together, such as the jugular fossa. A brainstem lesion could also cause impaired functioning of multiple cranial nerves, but this condition would likely also be accompanied by distal motor impairment.

A neurological examination can test the functioning of individual cranial nerves, and detect specific impairments.

== Facial nerve palsy ==
The facial nerve is the seventh of 12 cranial nerves. This cranial nerve controls the muscles in the face. Facial nerve palsy is more abundant in older adults than in children and is said to affect 15-40 out of 100,000 people per year. This disease comes in many forms which include congenital, infectious, traumatic, neoplastic, or idiopathic. The most common cause of this cranial nerve damage is Bell's palsy (idiopathic facial palsy) which is a paralysis of the facial nerve. Although Bell's palsy is more prominent in adults it seems to be found in those younger than 20 or older than 60 years of age. Bell's Palsy is thought to occur by an infection of the herpes virus which may cause demyelination and has been found in patients with facial nerve palsy. Symptoms include flattening of the forehead, sagging of the eyebrow, and difficulty closing the eye and the mouth on the side of the face that is affected. The inability to close the mouth causes problems in feeding and speech. It also causes lack of taste, lacrimation, and sialorrhea.

The use of steroids can help in the treatment of Bell's Palsy. If in the early stages, steroids can increase the likelihood of a full recovery. This treatment is used mainly in adults. The use of steroids in children has not been proven to work because they seem to recover completely with or without them. Children also tend to have better recovery rates than older adults. Recovery rate also depends on the cause of the facial nerve palsy (e.g. infections, perinatal injury, congenital dysplastic). If the palsy is more severe patients should seek steroids or surgical procedures. Facial nerve palsy may be the indication of a severe condition and when diagnosed a full clinical history and examination are recommended.

Although rare, facial nerve palsy has also been found in patients with HIV seroconversion. Symptoms found include headaches (bitemporal or occipital), the inability to close the eyes or mouth, and may cause the reduction of taste. Few cases of bilateral facial nerve palsy have been reported and is said to only effect 1 in every 5 million per year.

== Others ==
- Eyes
  - Oculomotor nerve palsy - Oculomotor nerve (III)
  - Fourth nerve palsy - Trochlear nerve (IV)
  - Sixth nerve palsy - Abducens nerve (VI)
- Other
  - Trigeminal neuralgia - Trigeminal nerve (V)
  - Facial nerve paralysis, Bell's palsy, Melkersson–Rosenthal syndrome, Central seven - Facial nerve (VII)
  - Accessory nerve disorder - Accessory nerve (XI)
