= Cranial roots of accessory nerve =

Portion of accessory nerve found in humans

- Brain stem sagittal section (11 visible near bottom center. In this diagram, the root derives entirely from the spinal portion, and ascends to the cranium.)

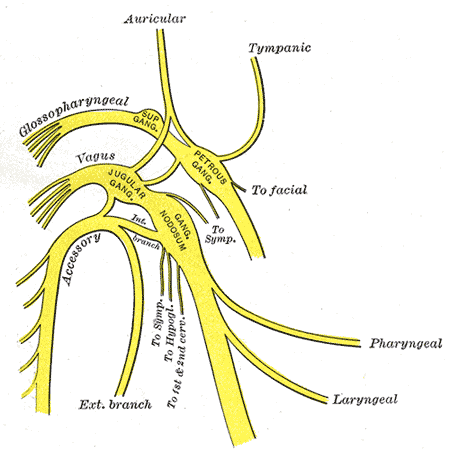
- Plan of upper portions of glossopharyngeal, vagus, and accessory nerves.

Details

Identifiers
- Latin: radix cranialis nervi accessorii, pars vagalis nervi accessorii
- TA98: A14.2.01.185
- TA2: 6353
- FMA: 77543

The cranial roots of the accessory nerve or vagal part, is the smaller of the two portions of the accessory nerve. It is generally considered as a part of the vagus nerve and not part of the accessory nerve proper because the cranial component rapidly joins the vagus nerve and serves the same function as other vagal nerve fibers. The concept of a cranial root of the accessory nerve was challenged by neuroanatomical studies which found that an unambiguous cranial root was not present in the majority of cases, but a small study in 2007 followed by a substantially larger study published in 2012 both confirmed that the cranial root of the accessory nerve is commonly found in humans, matching traditional descriptions.

== Path ==
The cranial root fibers arise from the cells of the nucleus ambiguus and emerge as four or five delicate rootlets from the side of the medulla oblongata, below the roots of the vagus.

It runs lateralward to the jugular foramen, where it may interchange fibers with the spinal portion or even become united to it for a short distance; here it is also connected by one or two filaments with the jugular ganglion of the vagus.

It then passes through the jugular foramen, separates from the spinal portion and is continued over the surface of the ganglion nodosum of the vagus, to the surface of which it is adherent, and is distributed principally to the pharyngeal and superior laryngeal branches of the vagus. Through the pharyngeal branch it probably supplies the uvula muscle, and levator veli palatini. Some few filaments from it are continued into the trunk of the vagus below the ganglion, to be distributed with the recurrent laryngeal nerve and probably also with the cervical cardiac branches.

== Relationship to vagus ==
As the fibers from the presumptive cranial roots may not join the accessory nerve at all or at best for a very short distance within the jugular foramen, it appears more useful to consider them in general to be part of the cranial roots of the vagus nerve. The accessory nerve would then be a pure motor nerve supplying the trapezius and sternocleidomastoid muscles, with the fibers originating from the spinal segments C1-C5 (the medullary roots of the accessory nerve).
