= Trapezoid (disambiguation) =

Trapezoid may refer to:

- Trapezoid or trapezium, a geometric figure
- Trapezoid bone, a bone in the hand
- Trapezoid (band), an American folk music group
- Trapezoid or trapezius muscle
- Goaltender trapezoid, an area of a hockey rink
- Trapezoid, a former musical project of Neil Cicierega before he formed Lemon Demon

== See also ==
- Trapeze, an acrobatic device shaped like a trapezoid
- Trapezium (disambiguation)
