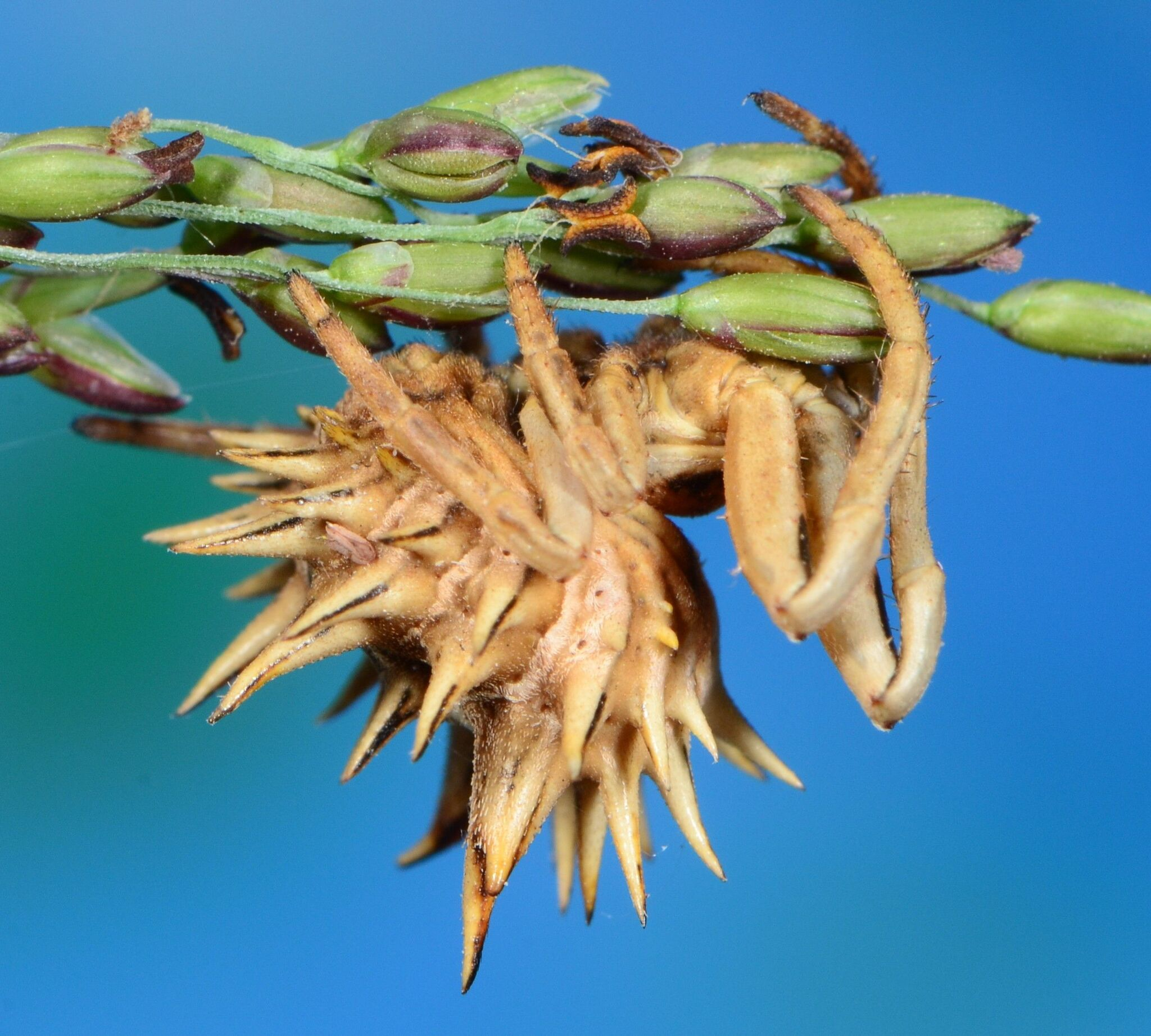
- Female in the wild
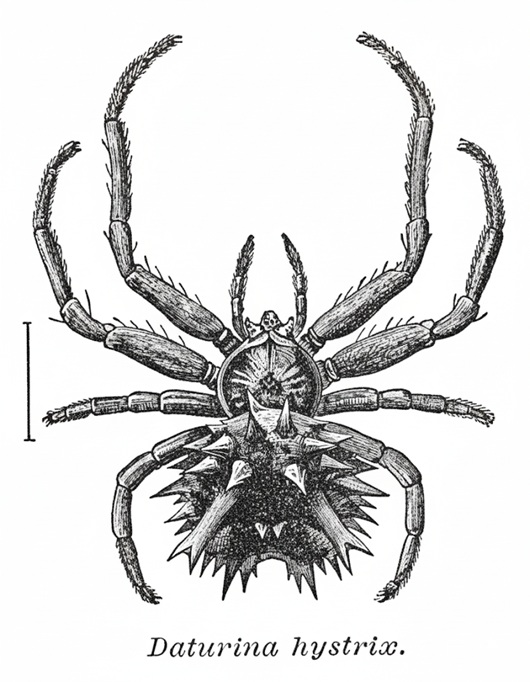
- 1877 drawing by Thorell

Scientific classification
- Kingdom: Animalia
- Phylum: Arthropoda
- Subphylum: Chelicerata
- Class: Arachnida
- Order: Araneae
- Infraorder: Araneomorphae
- Family: Araneidae
- Genus: Pycnacantha
- Species: P. tribulus

Binomial name
- Pycnacantha tribulus (Fabricius, 1781)

Synonyms
- Aranea tribulus Fabricius, 1781; Pycnacantha meadii Blackwall, 1865; Daturina hystrix Thorell, 1877

= Pycnacantha tribulus =

Hedgehog spider

Species of spider

Pycnacantha tribulus, commonly known as the hedgehog spider, is a species of orb weaver spider in the family Araneidae. It is the first spider species to have been collected and described from South Africa. The species is notable for its characteristic spiky abdomen and its highly reduced orb web, which has been modified into a simple trapezium shape.

== Etymology ==
The species name tribulus refers to its resemblance to the spiky fruit of Tribulus terrestris, an annual plant in the caltrop family (Zygophyllaceae) known for bearing strong spikes. The common name "hedgehog spider" also alludes to the spiky protuberances covering its abdomen.

== Description ==
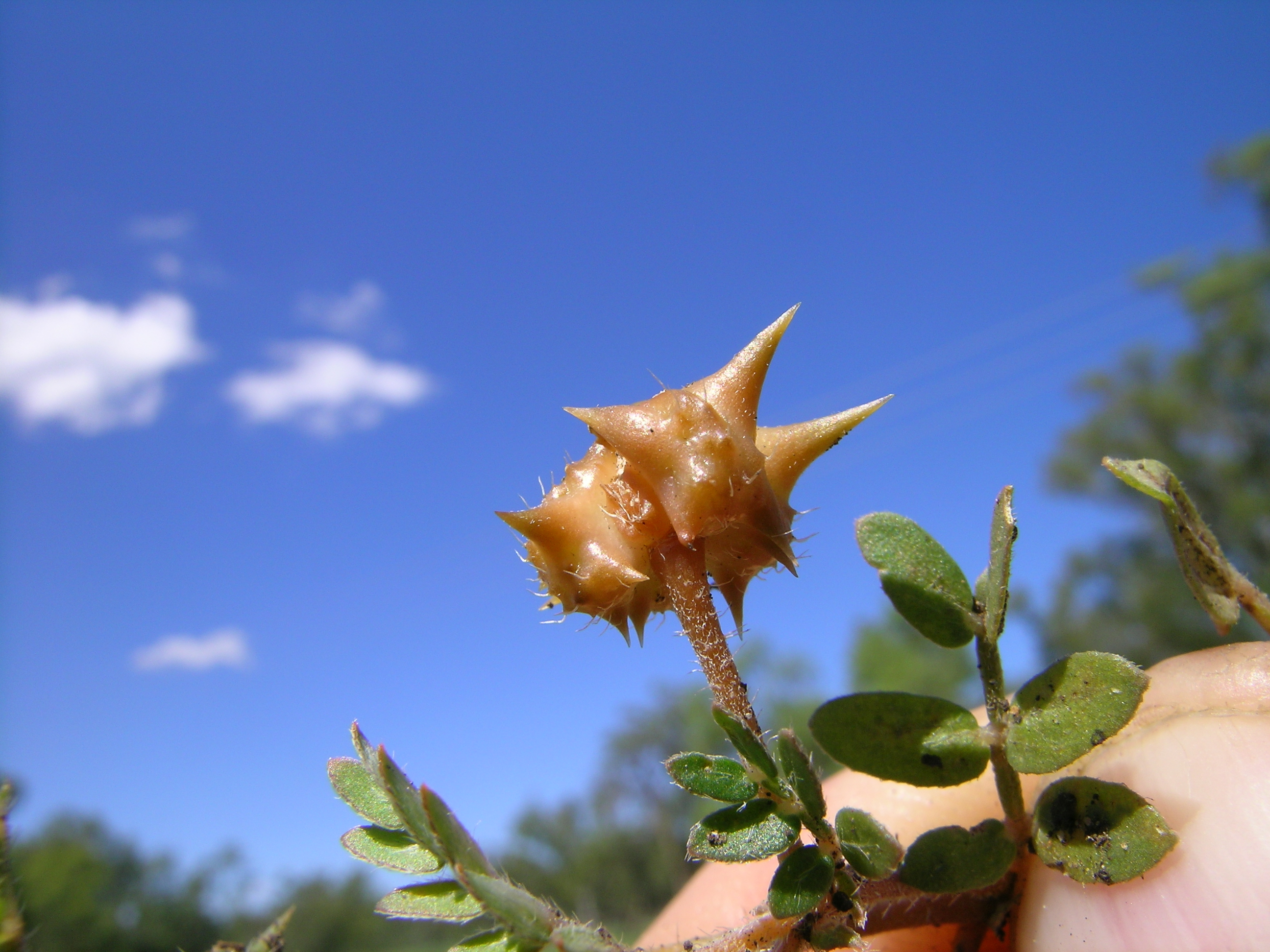
fruit of Tribulus terrestris

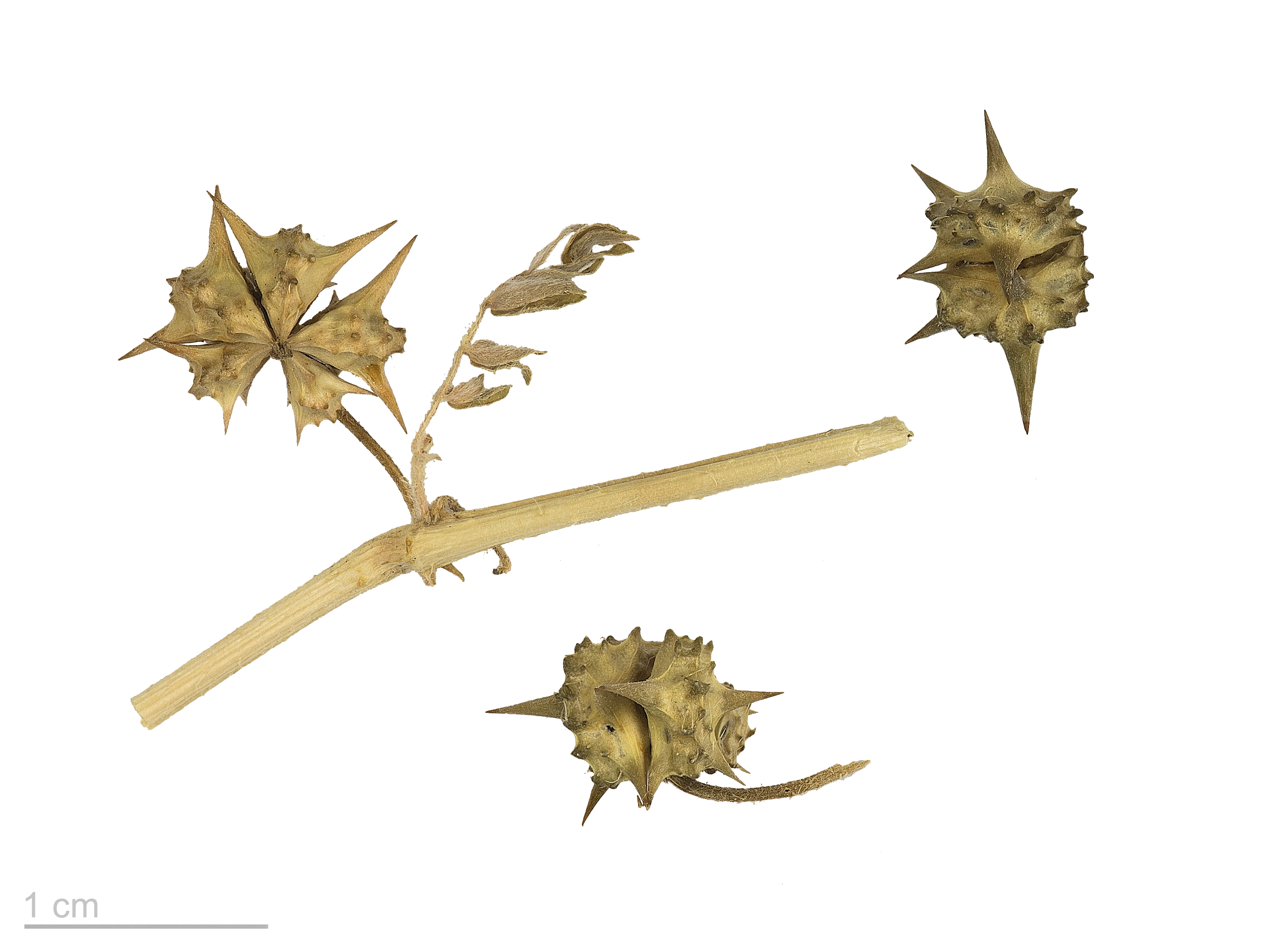

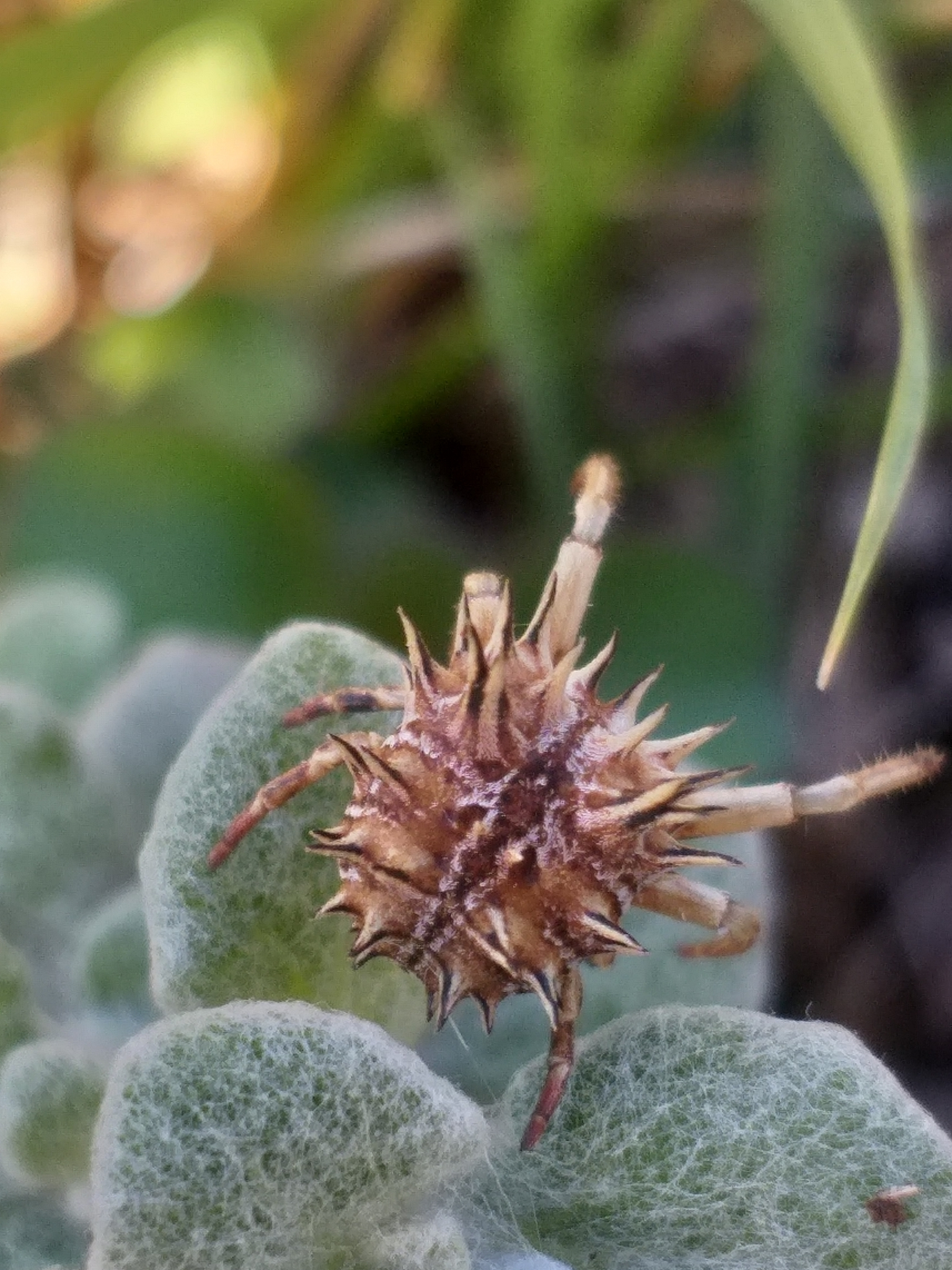
P. tribulus

Pycnacantha tribulus females measure 8–12 mm in body length. The coloration resembles dry grass, varying from creamy yellow to pale brown, providing excellent camouflage in their grassland habitat.

The cephalothorax is slightly longer than wide and narrower in the eye region, with a fovea showing a slight indentation covered by dense short setae. The eight eyes are arranged in two rows, with the lateral eyes situated close together on distinct protuberances and the four median eyes seated on a narrow, prominent protuberance directed obliquely upwards and forwards. The sternum is heart-shaped.

The legs are moderately robust, with the first and second pairs much longer than the third and fourth, the first being the longest and the third the shortest. The metatarsi and tarsi of the first pair are more slender with a slight curve and bear strong macrosetae that help hold prey.

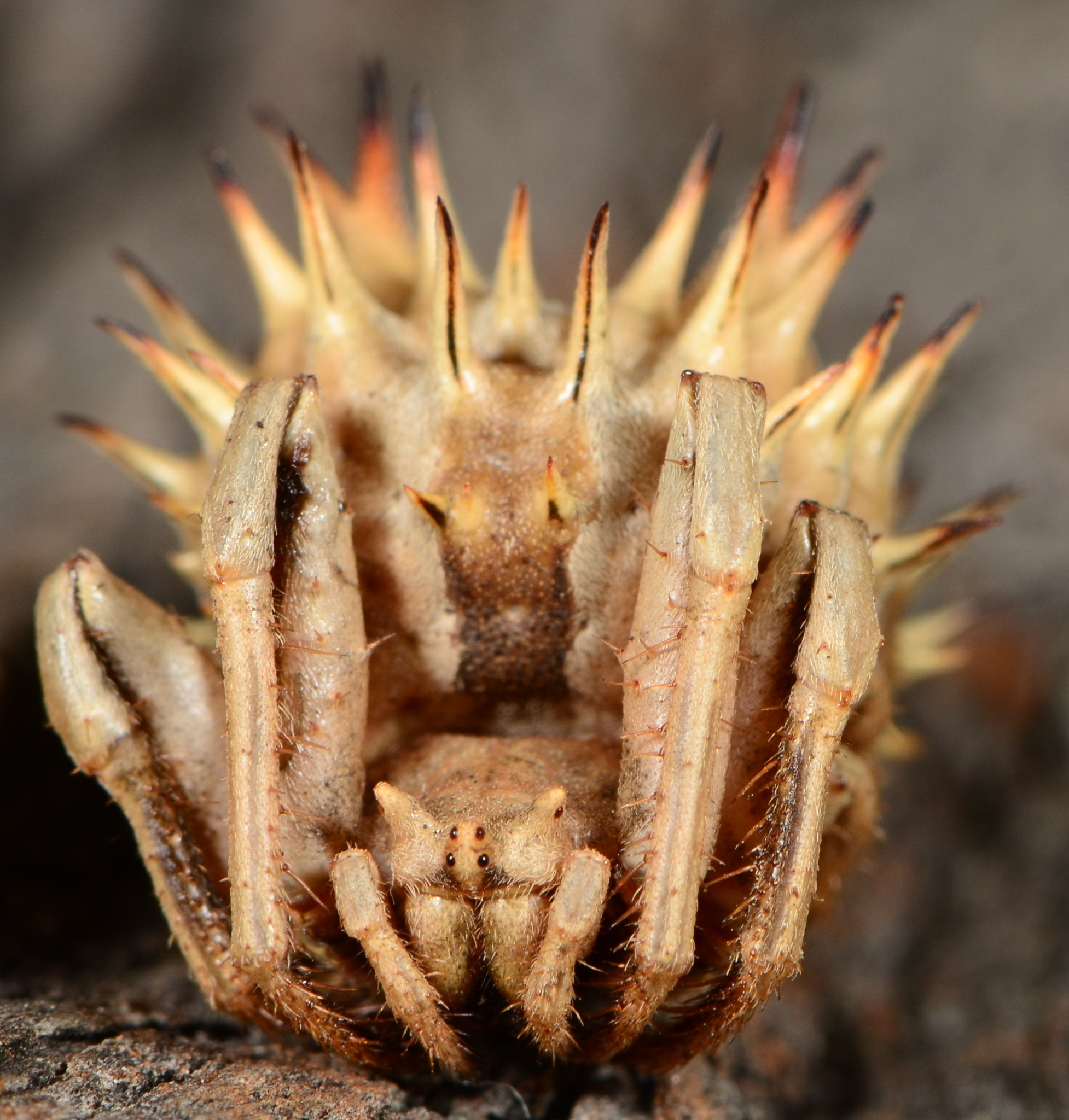
female

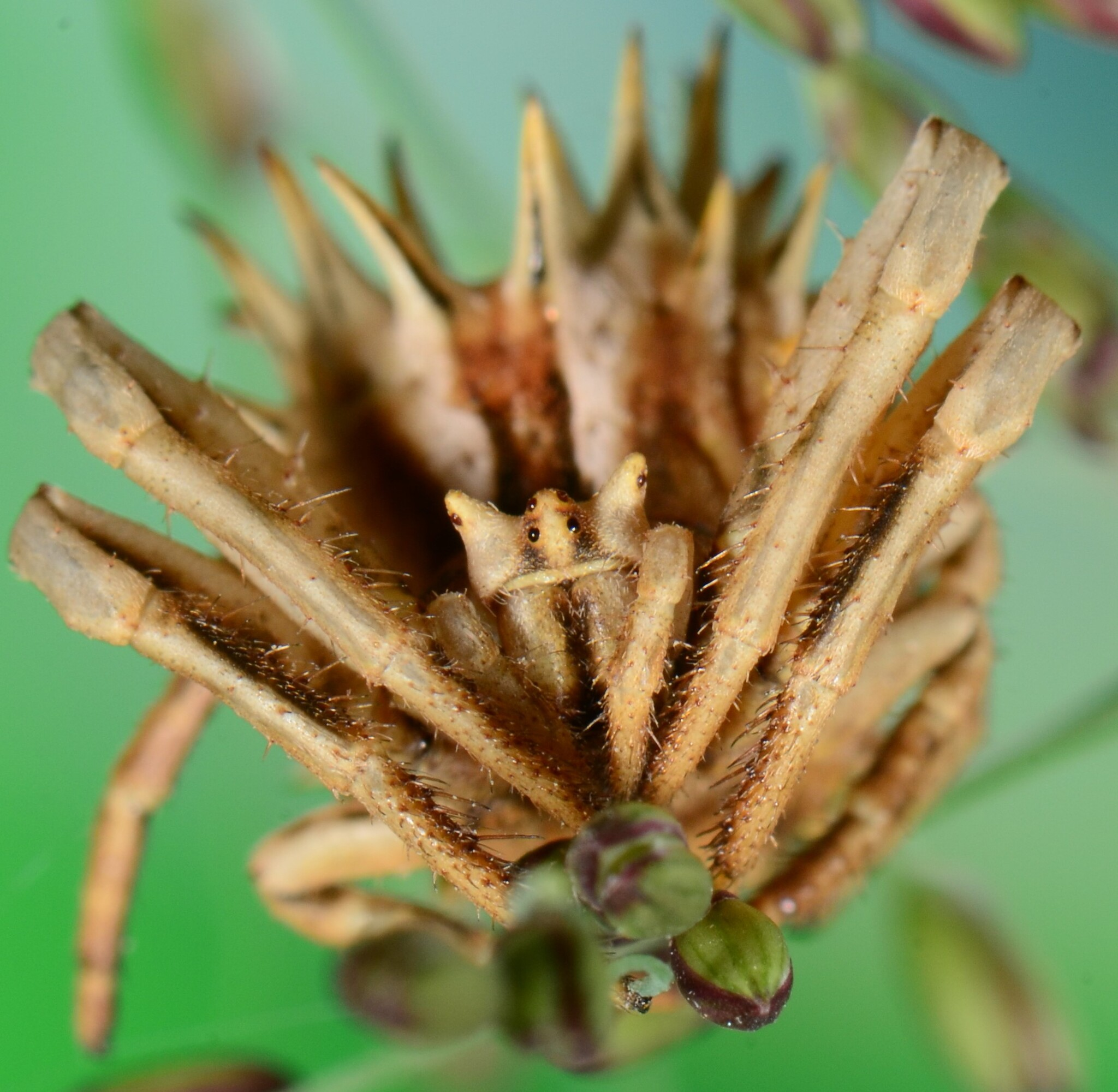
female

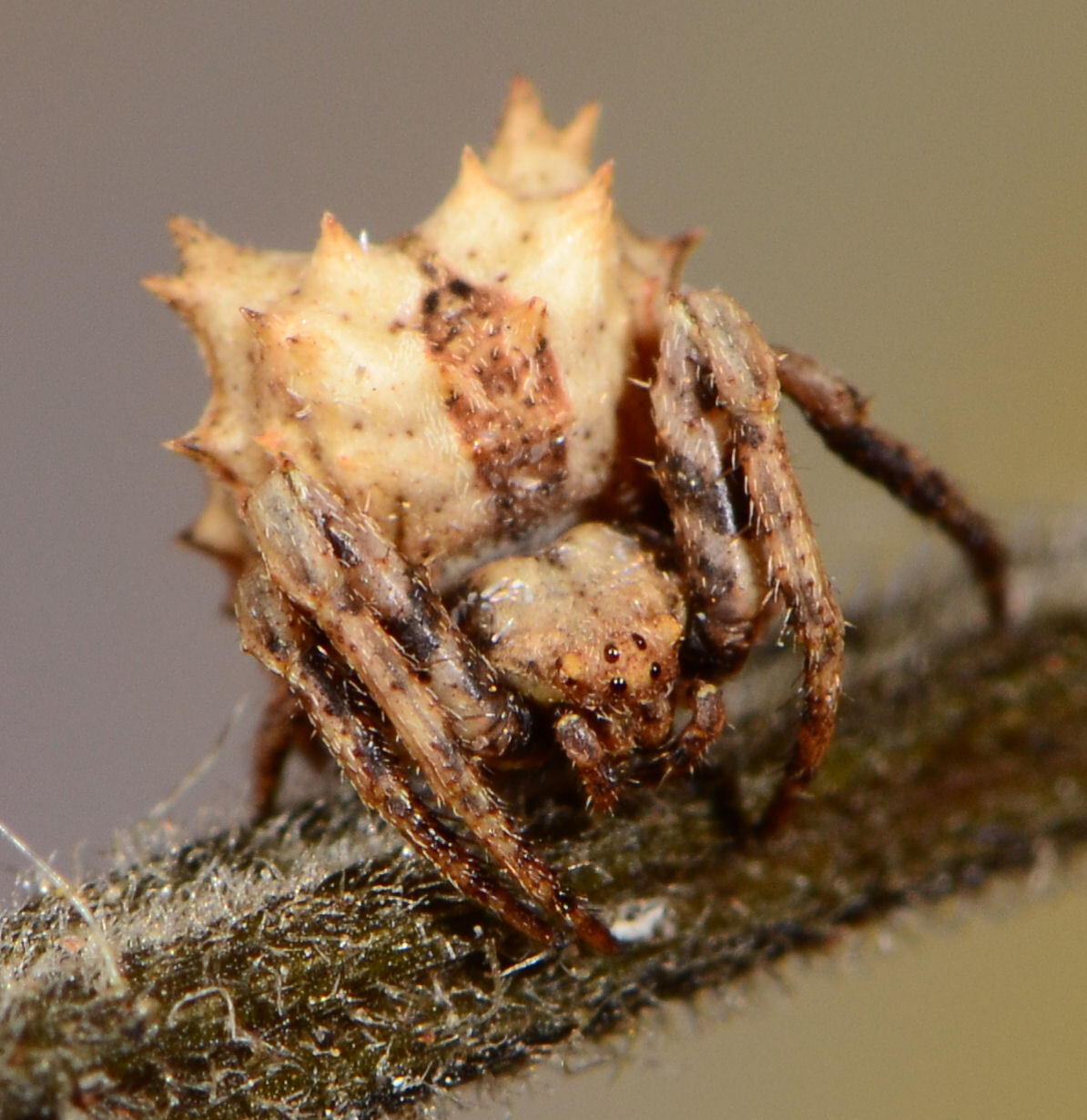
juvenile

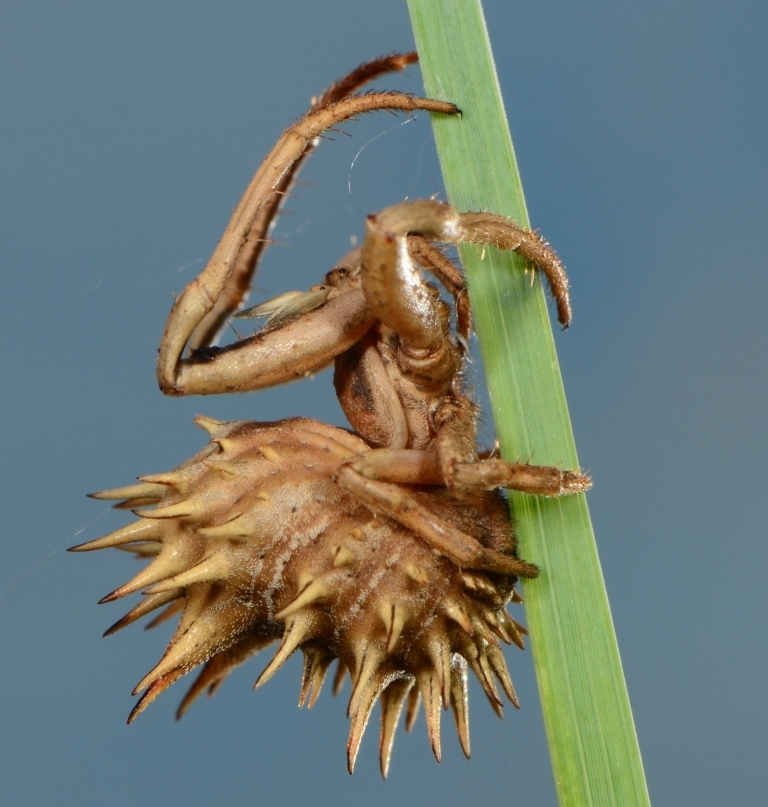
female

The most distinctive feature is the opisthosoma, which is sub-globose and convex above, projecting over the base of the cephalothorax. It is armed with approximately fifty sharp-pointed protuberances on the upper part and sides, of which two are usually more prominent and unequally forked. The number and shape of these protuberances varies between specimens. They are dull-yellow with a narrow dark band running dorsally, and the integument is covered by dense short setae.

The epigyne appears as a narrow transverse orifice with a reddish-brown coloration.

Males have been collected but remain undescribed.

== Distribution and habitat ==
Pycnacantha tribulus is distributed across Malawi, Zimbabwe, Mozambique, and South Africa. In South Africa, the species has been recorded from eight provinces: Eastern Cape, Free State, Gauteng, KwaZulu-Natal, Limpopo, Mpumalanga, North West, and Western Cape. The species appears to be absent from the Northern Cape.

The species inhabits grassland and savanna biomes, where it dwells among grasses and low vegetation. Its grass-like coloration and spiky body provide excellent camouflage, making it difficult to spot in the field.

== Behavior and ecology ==
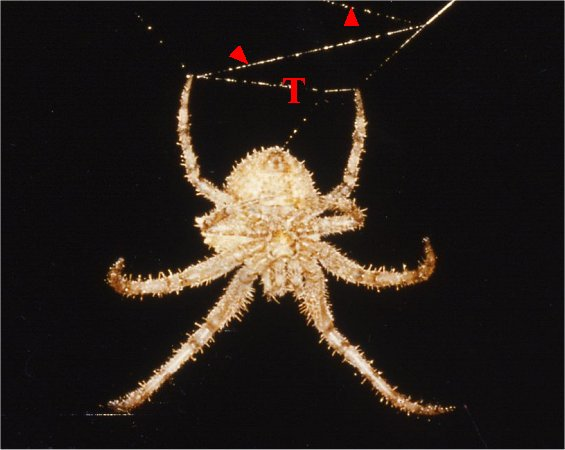
Kaira alba in its rudimentary web

Pycnacantha tribulus exhibits a highly specialized hunting strategy using a reduced orb web. During the day, the spider rests on grass, and in the evening, it spins a U-shaped trapezium web between two adjacent grass stems. The spider hangs upside down from its hind legs with its front legs stretched out to grasp prey in flight.

This web reduction represents an adaptation where only silk threads forming a trapezium remain of the original orb web structure. The loss of prey-detection capabilities from the reduced web is compensated by the spider's ability to attract prey, likely through the production of mimetic pheromones that attract male moths, similar to bolas spiders. Once captured, prey may be wrapped in silk before feeding commences.

The species primarily feeds on moths. Like some other genera in the tribe Poltyini (Kaira, Poltys) showing similar prey preferences, they possess strong leg setae adapted for holding winged prey.

== Life cycle ==
Females produce three pale yellow, drum-shaped egg sacs at intervals of approximately two weeks. Each egg sac contains 30–35 eggs and is suspended on twigs. The second instar spiderlings are shiny and dark brown with reddish-orange spots but lack the characteristic abdominal protuberances of adults. The spiderlings remain tightly grouped near the egg sac location and readily accept small moths as prey.

== Taxonomy ==
The species was originally described by Johan Christian Fabricius in 1781 as Aranea tribulus based on material collected from "Cap bonae spei" (Cape of Good Hope). The type specimen was collected by Dr. L. Schultze, but according to Zimsen (1964), the type material is probably lost or destroyed.

Eugène Simon in 1895 synonymized the genus Daturina Thorell, 1877 with Pycnacantha, and found both P. meadii Blackwall, 1865 and Daturina hystrix Thorell, 1877 to be junior synonyms of P. tribulus.

== Conservation status ==
Pycnacantha tribulus has a wide distribution range and faces no significant threats, leading to its classification as Least Concern. The species is recorded from numerous protected areas across South Africa, including several nature reserves and national parks.
