= Trap bar =

Weight training implement

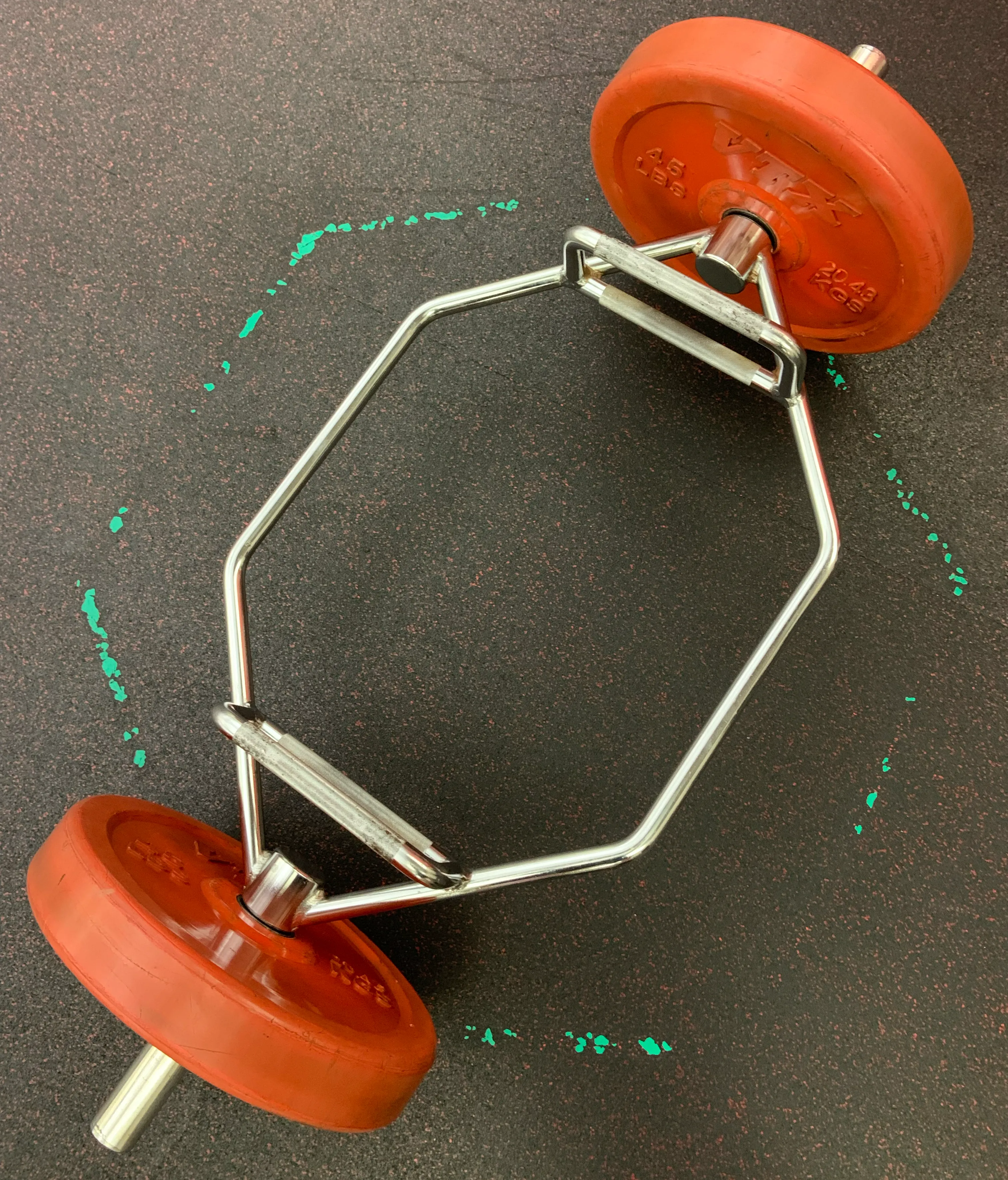
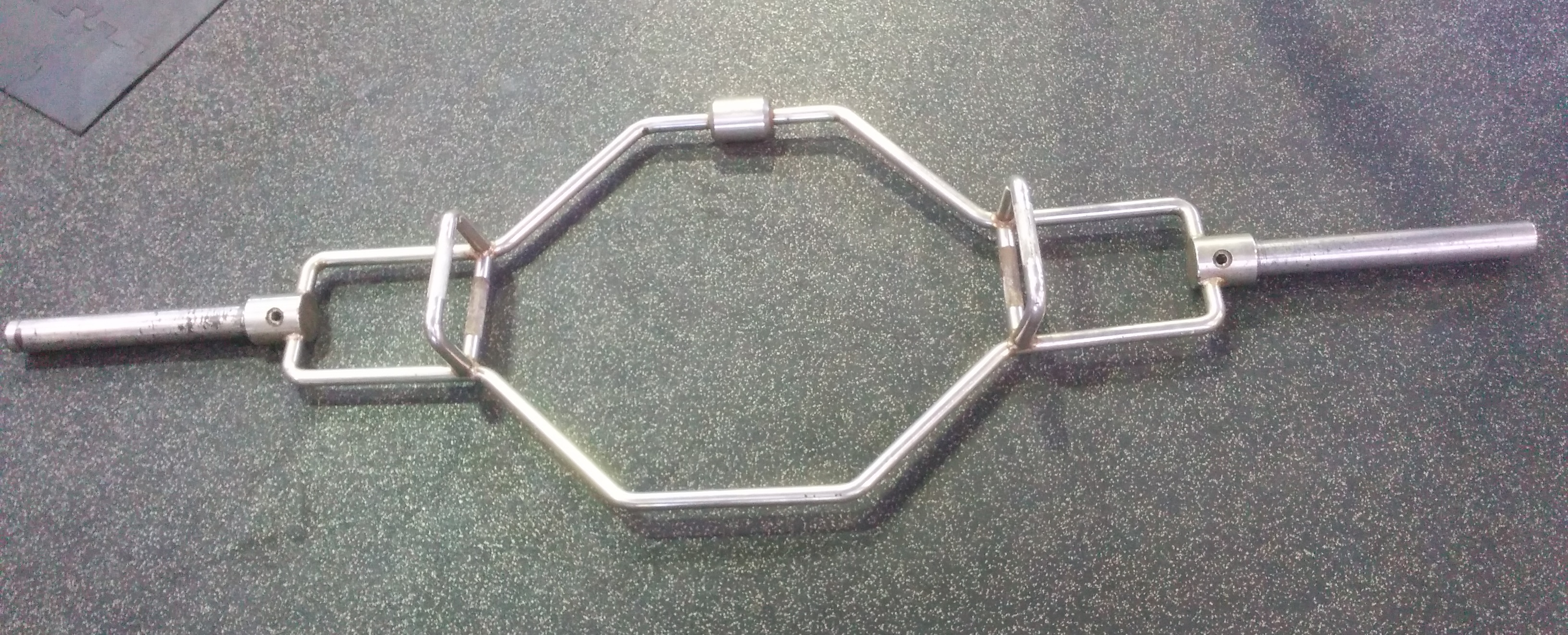
A trap bar. Usually used for deadlifts and shrugs, it can also be used for trap bar jumps. Trap bars often have two pairs of handles: one pair projects upwards in a squared D shape from the bar and one pair is level with the bar. The bar can be flipped over to make either pair more accessible. This gives a choice of two different grip heights with which to begin the lift.

The trap bar (also referred to as the hex bar) is an implement used in weight training. It is an assemblage of bars bent into an angle, then welded into a shape which lies flat in a plane, consisting of:

1. A barstock welded into a hexagonal or diamond shape, sized to allow a person to stand in the middle
2. Two (almost always) coaxial stub bars, welded to opposing positions on the outside of the perimeter of the hollow portion to hold weight plates. The stubs are used for loading the trapbar with plates.
3. A set of handles pointing forward and back are welded inside the hollow portion. The handles are used to hold the trapbar while an exercise is performed. Note that these handles are aligned at a 90-degree angle to the plate-loading bars.

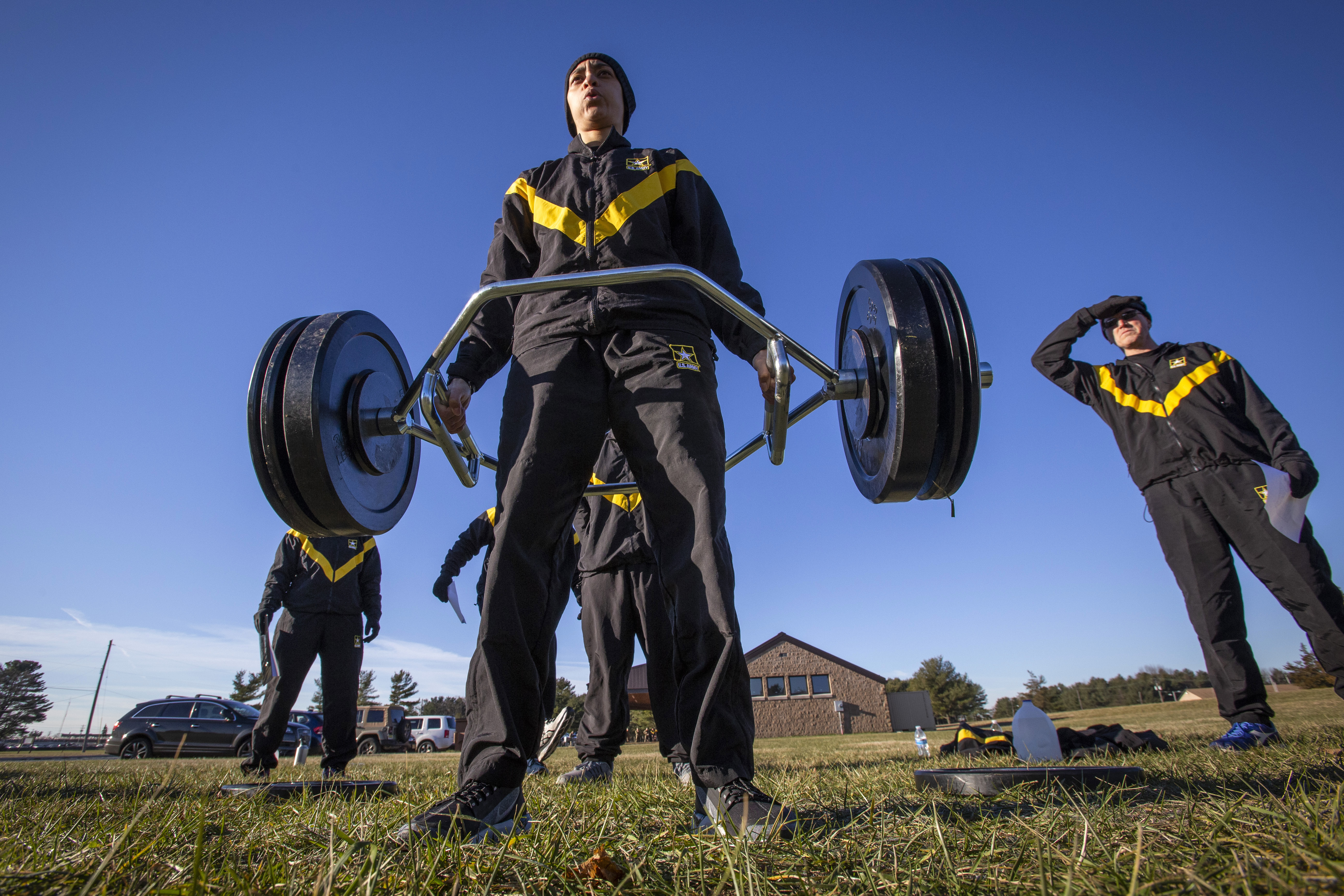
A hex bar deadlift is currently used in the US Army Fitness Test

The trap bar was invented, patented and trademarked by Al Gerard, a competitive powerlifter. It is often thought to have been named after the (upper fibres of the) trapezius muscles, the muscle it was designed to train, with shoulder shrugs. In addition to shrugs, the bar is also used for trapbar deadlift, trapbar jumps, overhead/military presses, upright rows or "high pulls," and stiff leg deadlifts. Its design has since changed from various original designs into a hexagonal shape, and can be correctly referred to as a "hex bar".

Variants are produced by several vendors.
