= Shrug (disambiguation) =

A shrug is a gesture that indicates either indifference or lack of knowledge.

Shrug may also refer to:

- Shrug (band), a band that later became Snow Patrol
- Shrug (clothing), an article of clothing
