= Shoulder shrug =

Strength exercise

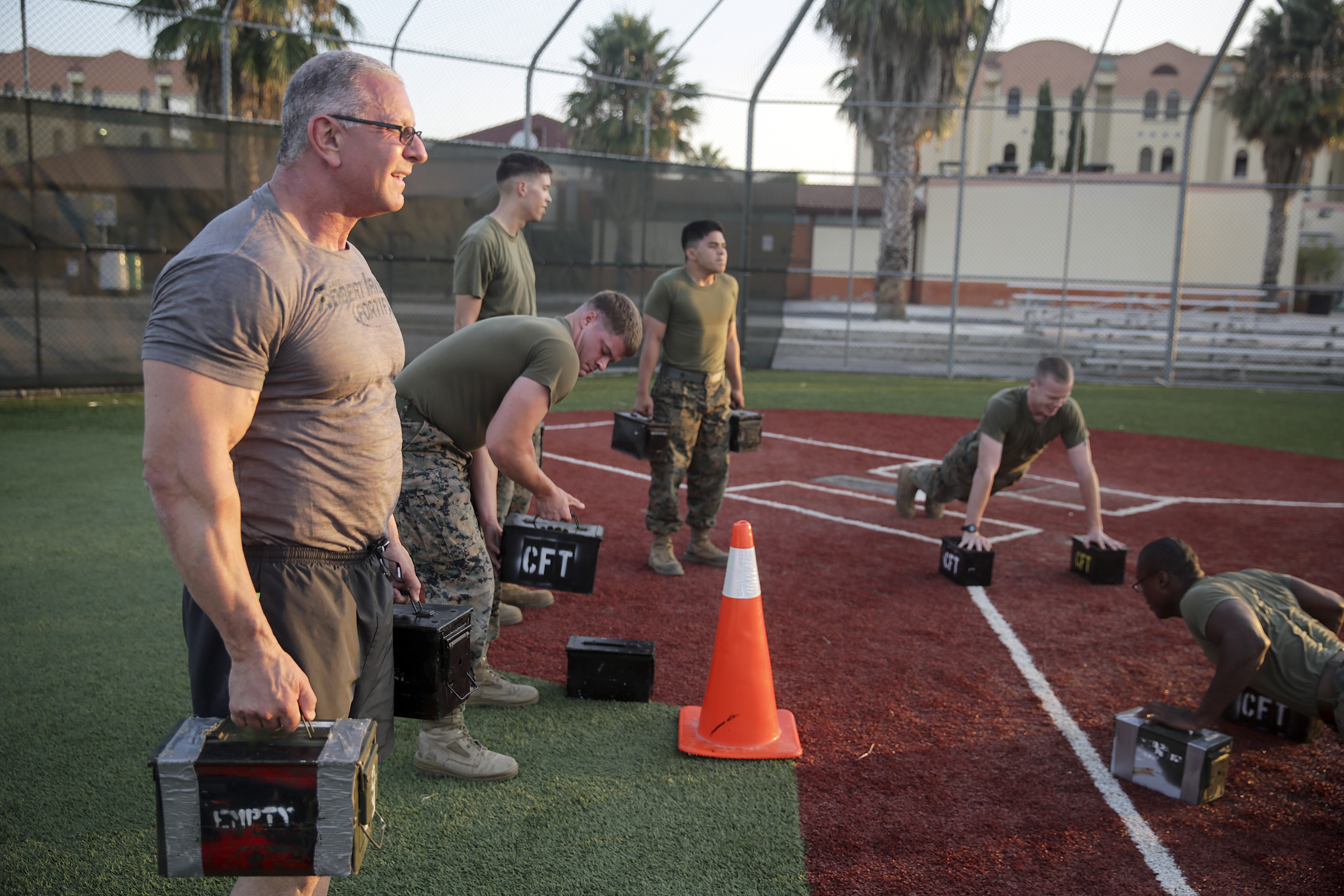
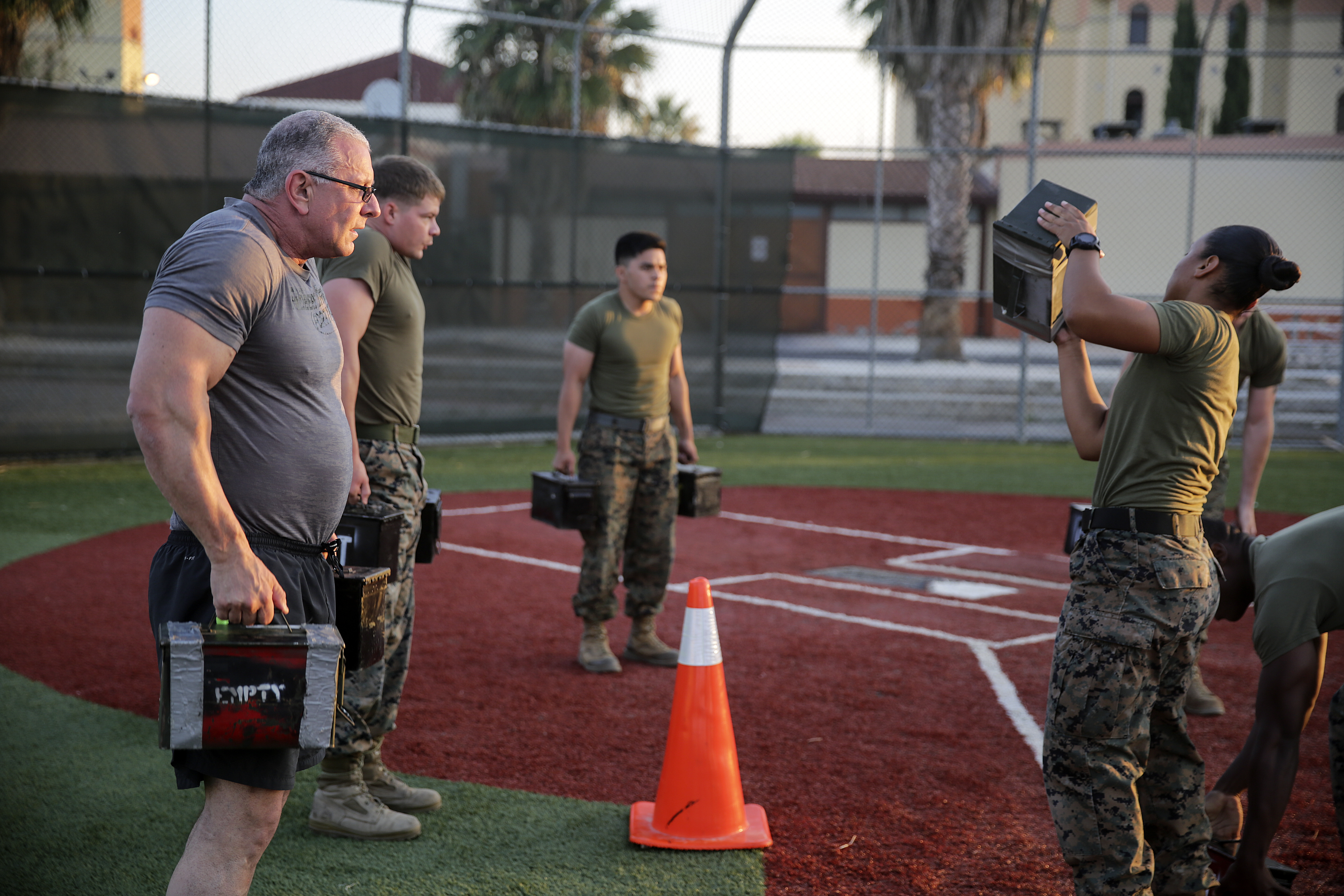
Shoulder shrug technique: Relaxed (left) and elevated.

In weight training, the shoulder shrug (usually called simply the shrug) is an exercise used to develop the upper trapezius muscle.

== Form and execution ==
The lifter stands erect, hands about shoulder width apart, and slowly raises the shoulders as high as possible, and then slowly lowers them, while not bending the elbows, or moving the body at all. The lifter may not have as large a range of motion as in a normal shrug done for active flexibility. It is usually considered good form if the slope of the shoulders is horizontal in the elevated position.

== Equipment ==
A barbell, dumbbells, trap bar, resistance bands, parallel bars, or a Smith machine may be used for resistance, and overhand, inside, outside, underhand or mixed grip can be used. The barbell can be held in front of the thighs, resting on the quadriceps, or behind, resting on the hamstrings. Using these excludes inside and outside grips. One or two dumbbells or kettlebells can also be used, together or opposite one another. A trapbar can also be used, necessitating an inside grip. Standing calf raise machines can also be used to execute the shrugging movement, by resting the pads on the shoulders and trying to raise the shoulders as high as possible.

== Benefits ==
Shoulder shrug exercises can help to strengthen neck and shoulder muscles which in results help to reduce neck pain. The core muscle that gets activated during shoulder shrugs is the trapezius.
