= Shrug =

Gesture of raising both shoulders

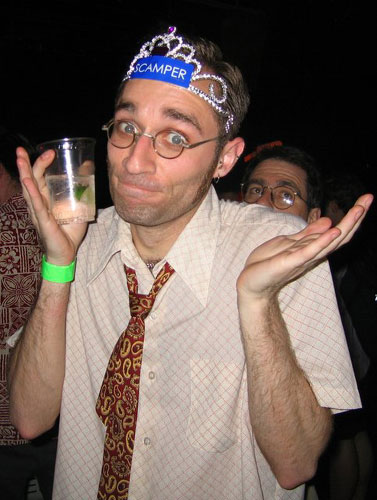
A man shrugging

A shrug is a gesture or posture performed by raising both shoulders. In certain countries, it is a representation of an individual either being indifferent about something or not knowing an answer to a question.

== Shrugging ==
The shoulder-raising action may be accompanied by rotating the palms upwards, pulling closed lips downwards, raising the eyebrows or tilting the head to one side. A shrug is an emblem, meaning that it integrates the vocabulary of only certain cultures and may be used in place of words. In many countries, such as the United States, Sweden and Morocco, a shrug represents hesitation or lack of knowledge; however, in other countries, such as Japan and China, shrugging is uncommon and is not used to show hesitation. People from the Philippines, Iran and Iraq may interpret a shrug as a somewhat impolite sign of confidence.

== Gallic shrug ==
The Gallic shrug, "generally a nuanced gesture with myriad meanings", is performed by sticking out one's lower lip, raising one's eyebrows and shoulders simultaneously, and voicing a calm bof.

== Emoji ==
The shrug gesture is a Unicode emoji included as U+1F937 🤷 SHRUG. The shrug emoticon made from Unicode characters is also typed as ¯\_(ツ)_/¯, where "ツ" is the character tsu from Japanese katakana.

== Exercises ==
Diagram showing how to do shoulder shrugs after breast reconstruction surgery

Shrugging exercises can be used to strengthen one's trapezius muscle. Some exercises include:

- A shoulder shrug involves holding weights in one's hands and shrugging one's shoulders up, but without rolling them.
- A Hise shrug, so named for its inventor Joseph Curtis Hise (fl. 1930s – died 1972), involves putting a barbell behind one's neck and shrugging.
- An upward rotation shrug involves performing a shrug with 30 degrees of glenohumeral abduction.

== See also ==
- Indifference (emotion)
- Meh
