= Accessory nerve disorder =

Nerve injury

- Other names: Spinal accessory nerve palsy
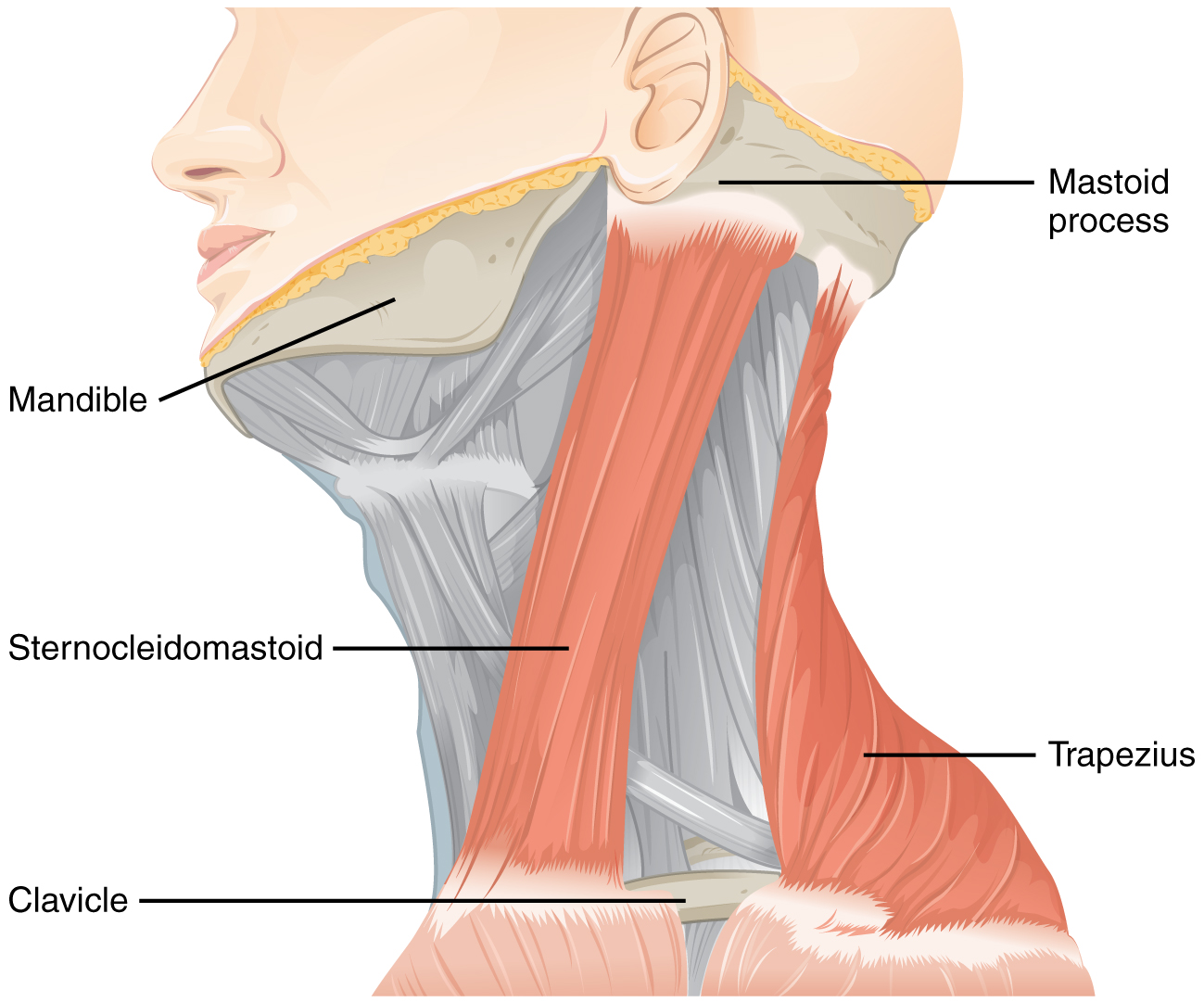
- Muscles innervated by the accessory nerve
- Specialty: Neurology

Accessory nerve disorder is an injury to the spinal accessory nerve which results in diminished or absent function of the sternocleidomastoid muscle and upper portion of the trapezius muscle.

== Signs and symptoms ==
Patients with spinal accessory nerve paralysis often exhibit signs of lower motor neuron disease such as diminished muscle mass, fasciculations, and partial paralysis of the sternocleidomastoid and trapezius muscles. Interruption of the nerve supply to the sternocleidomastoid muscle results in an asymmetric neckline, while weakness of the trapezius muscle can produce a drooping shoulder, winged scapula, and a weakness of forward elevation of the shoulder.

== Causes ==
Medical procedures are the most common cause of injury to the spinal accessory nerve. In particular, radical neck dissection and cervical lymph node biopsy are among the most common surgical procedures that result in spinal accessory nerve damage. London notes that a failure to rapidly identify spinal accessory nerve damage may exacerbate the problem, as early intervention leads to improved outcomes.

== Treatment ==
There are several options of treatment when iatrogenic (i.e., caused by the surgeon) spinal accessory nerve damage is noted during surgery. For example, during a functional neck dissection that injures the spinal accessory nerve, injury prompts the surgeon to cautiously preserve branches of C2, C3, and C4 spinal nerves that provide supplemental innervation to the trapezius muscle. Alternatively, or in addition to intraoperative procedures, postoperative procedures can also help in recovering the function of a damaged spinal accessory nerve. For example, the Eden-Lange procedure, in which remaining functional shoulder muscles are surgically repositioned, may be useful for treating trapezius muscle palsy.
