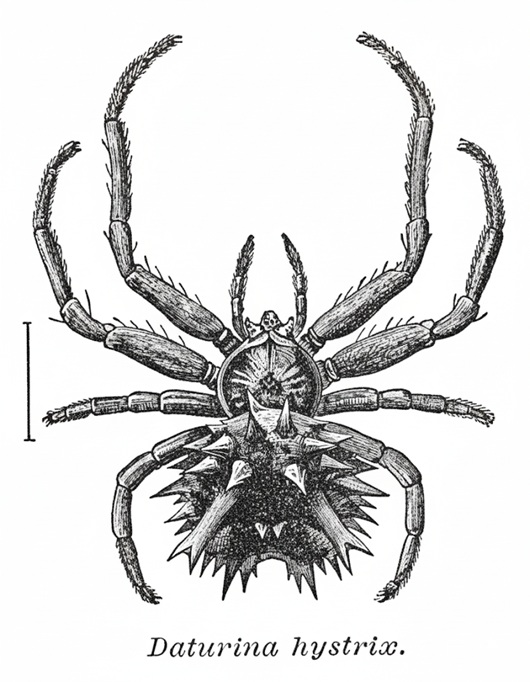
- 1877 drawing of P. tribulus
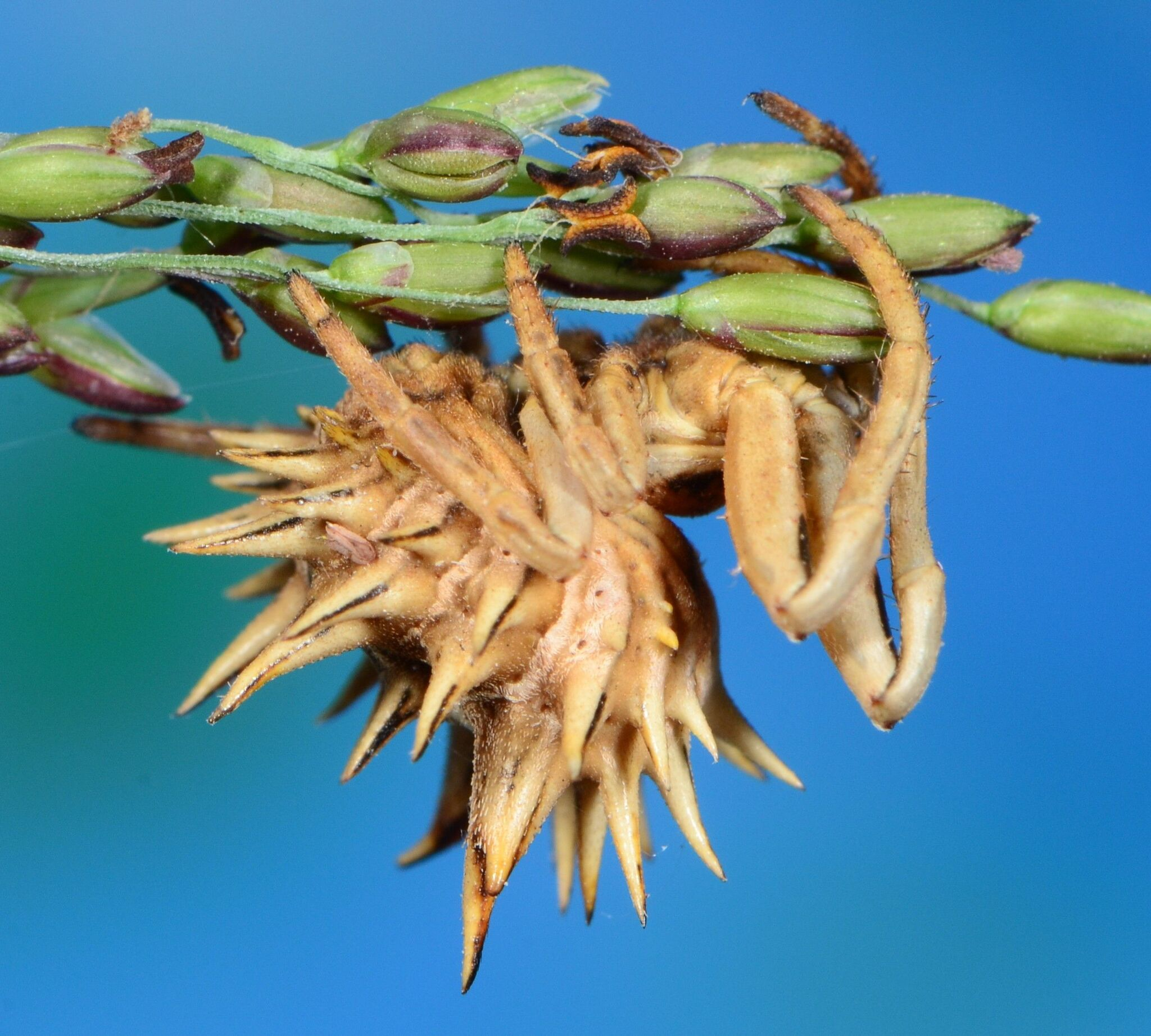
- female P. tribulus

Scientific classification
- Kingdom: Animalia
- Phylum: Arthropoda
- Subphylum: Chelicerata
- Class: Arachnida
- Order: Araneae
- Infraorder: Araneomorphae
- Family: Araneidae
- Genus: Pycnacantha; Blackwall, 1865

Type species
- P. tribulus (Fabricius, 1781)

Species
- 4, see text

= Pycnacantha =

Genus of spiders

Pycnacantha is a genus of African orb-weaver spiders first described by John Blackwall in 1865.

== Species ==
As of September 2025, this genus includes four species:

- Pycnacantha dinteri Meise, 1932 – Namibia
- Pycnacantha echinotes Meise, 1932 – Cameroon
- Pycnacantha fuscosa Simon, 1903 – Madagascar
- Pycnacantha tribulus (Fabricius, 1781) – Malawi, Zimbabwe, Mozambique, South Africa (type species)
