= Eden–Lange procedure =

Orthopedic procedure

- Specialty: Orthopedic surgery
- Uses: Accessory nerve disorder
- Types: Modified Eden–Lange procedure, Triple Tendon Transfer
- Recovery time: Months
- Other options: Scapular fixation
- Frequency: Rare
- [edit on Wikidata]

The Eden–Lange procedure is an orthopedic procedure to alleviate the symptoms of trapezius palsy when more conservative measures, such as spontaneous resolution and surgical nerve repair are not promising. The rhomboid major, rhomboid minor, and levator scapulae muscles are transferred laterally along the scapula to replace the functions of the lower, middle, and upper fibers of the trapezius, respectively. The transferred muscles hold the scapula in a more medial and upwardly rotated position, without winging.

== Versions ==
=== Eden–Lange procedure ===
The original technique was first described by Eden in 1924 and verified by Lange in the 1950s. The rhomboid major and rhomboid minor were transferred laterally from the medial border of the scapula to the infraspinatous fossa, and the levator scapulae was transferred laterally to the spine of the scapula, near the acromion.

=== Modified Eden–Lange procedure ===
The procedure was first modified by Bigliani et al. in 1996. The change was transferring the rhomboid minor to the supraspinatous fossa to allow the rhomboid minor to better replicate line of pull of the middle trapezius.

=== Triple tendon transfer ===
The triple tendon transfer (T3 transfer) was described by Elhassan et al. at the Mayo Clinic in 2015, and since 2010 no other technique for intractable trapezius palsy has been used there. Like the original and modified Eden–Lange procedures, the levator scapulae is transferred to the scapular spine. In the T3 transfer, rather than transferring the rhomboids to the scapular fossae, they are transferred to the scapular spine, which better replicates the trapezius’ action of scapular upward rotation. In detail, the rhomboid minor is transferred to just medial of the transferred levator scapulae, and the rhomboid major is transferred to the medial scapular spine.

Another modified version that has been described is transferring the levator scapula and rhomboid minor to the scapular spine, like the T3 transfer, with transfer of the rhomboid major to the infraspinous fossa, like the original Eden–Lange.

== Indications ==
Symptomatic trapezius palsy lasting longer than one year indicates tendon transfer, since spontaneous recovery and nerve repair are unlikely to be successful then. Conservative management, such as physical therapy, is generally unsuccessful.

Symptomatic trapezius agenesis or hypogenesis, although rare, could be mitigated with an Eden–Lange procedure.

== Contraindications ==
Additional muscle deficits can contraindicate tendon transfer, namely the serratus anterior muscle or the muscles-to-be-transferred themselves. Serratus anterior muscle deficit is another cause of scapular winging and decreases the efficacy of an Eden–Lange procedure, but it can be overcome with a simultaneous pectoralis major transfer.

Muscular dystrophy often contraindicates tendon transfer, because the muscles transferred are either dystrophic or capable of becoming dystrophic. A pertinent example is facioscapulohumeral muscular dystrophy (FSHD), which commonly affects the trapezius, causing a need for scapular stabilization, but also commonly affects other periscapular muscles, which contraindicates the transfer.

Collagen disorders contraindicate tendon transfers in general, including the Eden–Lange procedure.

Scapulothoracic fusion, a salvage procedure, can be done when tendon transfer is contraindicated or in cases of failed tendon transfers.

== Risks ==
The dorsal scapular nerve is at risk for intraoperative injury when detaching the rhomboid and levator scapulae insertions due to its proximity to the medial scapular border. This is of particular concern because the dorsal scapular nerve innervates all three muscles transferred in the Eden–Lange procedure.
