= Trapezium =

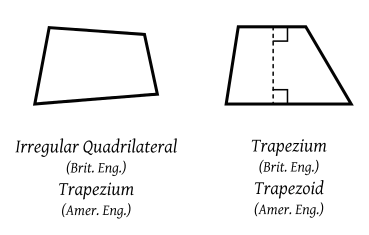
Comparisons of "trapezium" in both British and American English.

Trapezium, plural trapeziums or trapezia, may refer to:

- Trapezium, in British and other forms of English, a trapezoid, a quadrilateral that has exactly one pair of parallel sides
- Trapezium, in North American English, an irregular quadrilateral with no sides parallel
- Trapezium (bivalve), a genus of molluscs in the family Trapezidae
- Trapezium (bone), a bone in the hand
- Trapezia (crab), a genus of crabs
- Trapezium (novel), a Japanese novel by Kazumi Takayama
- The Trapezium, football ground, home of Wednesbury Strollers F.C.

== See also ==
- Trapezius, a muscle in the upper torso and neck
- Trapezium Cluster, a group of stars in the Orion Nebula
