= Spinal root of accessory nerve =

Nerve origin in the medulla

- Brain stem sagittal section (11 visible near bottom center)

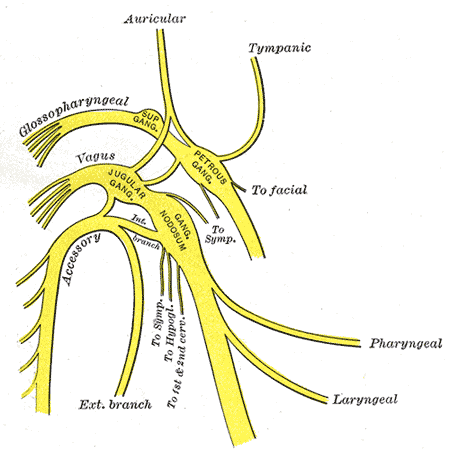
- Plan of upper portions of glossopharyngeal, vagus, and accessory nerves.

Details

Identifiers
- Latin: radix spinalis nervi accessorii, pars spinalis nervi accessorii
- TA98: A14.2.01.186
- TA2: 6354

The spinal root of accessory nerve (or part) is firm in texture, and its fibers arise from the motor cells in the lateral part of the anterior column of the gray substance of the medulla spinalis as low as the fifth cervical nerve.

Passing through the lateral funiculus of the medulla spinalis, they emerge on its surface and unite to form a single trunk, which ascends between the ligamentum denticulatum and the posterior roots of the spinal nerves; enters the skull through the foramen magnum, and is then directed to the jugular foramen, through which it passes, lying in the same sheath of dura mater as the vagus, but separated from it by a fold of the arachnoid.

In the jugular foramen, it receives one or two filaments from the cranial part of the nerve, or else joins it for a short distance and then separates from it again.

As it exits from the jugular foramen, it runs backward in front of the internal jugular vein in 66.6% of cases, and behind it in 33% of cases.

The nerve then descends obliquely behind the Digastricus and Stylohyoideus to the upper part of the Sternocleidomastoideus; it pierces this muscle, and courses obliquely across the posterior triangle of the neck, to end in the deep surface of the Trapezius.

As it traverses the Sternocleidomastoideus it gives several filaments to the muscle, and joins with branches from the second cervical nerve.

In the posterior triangle it unites with the second and third cervical nerves, while beneath the Trapezius it forms a plexus with the third and fourth cervical nerves, and from this plexus fibers are distributed to the muscle.
