= Central facial palsy =

- Other names: Central seven
- Specialty: Neurology

Central facial palsy (colloquially referred to as central seven) is a symptom or finding characterized by paralysis or paresis of the lower half of one side of the face. It usually results from damage to upper motor neurons of the facial nerve.

The facial motor nucleus has dorsal and ventral divisions that contain lower motor neurons supplying the muscles of the upper and lower face, respectively. The dorsal division receives bilateral upper motor neuron input (i.e. from both sides of the brain) while the ventral division receives only contralateral input (i.e. from the opposite side of the brain).

Thus, lesions of the corticobulbar tract between the cerebral cortex and pons and the facial motor nucleus destroy or reduce input to the ventral division, but ipsilateral input (i.e. from the same side) to the dorsal division is retained. As a result, central facial palsy is characterized by hemiparalysis or hemiparesis of the contralateral muscles of facial expression, but not the muscles of the forehead.

== Signs and symptoms ==
Central facial palsy is the paralysis of the lower half of one side of the face. This condition is often caused by a stroke. This condition is often the result of damage of the upper motor neurons of the facial nerve. The facial motor nucleus contains ventral and dorsal areas that have lower motor neurons that supply the upper and lower face muscles. When central facial palsy occurs, there are lesions in the corticobulbar tract between the cerebral cortex. Because of these lesions, the facial motor nucleus reduces or destroys input in the ventral division. The ipsilateral input in the dorsal region is preserved.

Central facial palsy is often characterized by either hemiparalysis or hemiparesis of the contralateral muscles in facial expression. Muscles on the forehead are left intact. Also, most patients have lost voluntary control of muscle movement in the face—however, muscles in the face involved in spontaneous emotional expression often remain intact. Central Facial palsy occurs in patients who are hemiplegic. Such patients not only have dysfunctions in the facial expression but also a difficulty in communication. Other oropharyngeal functions such as sucking, swallowing, and talking are also impaired.

Central facial paralysis/palsy often has similar characteristics with stroke patients. Because of uncrossed areas from the ipsilateral and the supranuclear areas, movements in the frontalis and upper orbicularis oculi are often spared. Facial movement can be present on the affected side when the person expresses emotion. Damage to the central nervous system motor pathway from the cerebral cortex to the facial nuclei is found in the pons. This leads to facial weakness that spares various muscles in the face depending on the type of paralysis. The discrepancy of the weakness between the upper and lower facial muscles are due to the bilateral corticonuclear innervation from the upper facial muscles and contralateral corticonuclear innervation to the lower facial muscles.

== The motor system and facial patterns ==
In contemporary perspectives, the motor cortex is composed of two distinct areas; however, this viewpoint is incorrect. The motor cortex is located in the posterior frontal lobe, and has multiple areas with anatomical and functional regions. Each area is involved in the circuitry of various inputs of sensory information. The motor and parietal areas are reciprocally intertwined and form a group of specialized circuits that work parallel to one another. These circuits transform sensory information into an action or movement.

The parieto-frontal circuits are the basic compositions of the main elements of the cortical motor system. These circuits depend on the motor area to receive afferent information from the parietal areas. The input in one area is predominant, containing full amounts of information. The other input area is known as moderate or weak. When the input is moderate or weak, it contains additional secondary information. Each parietal area is connected to several motor areas. However, it only makes privileged contact with one motor area. Exceptions to this include the prefrontal gyrus, where the parietal area sends an equal amount of fibers to multiple motor areas. This interaction is vital because the activity in the facial muscles is due to voluntary control of the direct and indirect pathways that are corticobulbar pathways. Facial muscles often respond to emotional influences by these pathways also. Most of our emotions are expressed more intensely on the left side than the right side of the face. The reason for the asymmetry however, remains unclear, a commonly concluded theory is that the right side of the hemisphere has an advantage in emotional processing than the left hemisphere. To examine facial muscle movement often, transcranial magnetic stimulation (TMS) is used.

Upper motoneuron lesions to the face often cause paralysis. The lesions cause weakness in various areas of the face while not affecting other areas of the face. This pattern of weakness due to the input of the motor neurons of the lower facial muscles is often maintained contralateral. The strength of the muscles in the upper region of the face are preserved better than the muscles in the lower face. It was found that in multiple anatomical studies that cortical input from both hemispheres could reach motoneurons that supply muscles of all aspects of the face. Through the combination of anterograde and retrograde tracing techniques in monkeys it was found that the facial nucleus, which supplies muscles of the lower face are innervated bilaterally. Using TMS has shown the activation of both hemispheres during facial expression and emotion. However, there have been some discrepancies with the use of this method including differences in observations when using single and multiple needles as well as the areas of where the needles are placed. Using electrical cortical mapping bilateral movements were observed in the lower facial muscles compared to unilateral movements. From anatomic studies on patients with unilateral infarction, motoneurons in the lower facial area were innervated bilaterally; however, there was predominance in contralateral areas of the lower face.

== Diagnosis ==
Through electrophysiological studies and neuronal tracing, these characteristics do not fully support the typical person with central facial palsy. Often, transcranial magnetic stimulation (TMS) is used to understand the bilateral corticonuclear projections of the lower facial motor neurons. This idea using bilateral innervation to the upper facial motor neurons is rarely tested by humans because of the afferent fibers in the trigeminal nerve are distributed over the head and face and could cause damage. Supranuclear motor innervation of the facial musculature is difficult to examine because the circuitry is quite complex, only a few cases are described in literature of central facial palsy and the absence of bilateral perioral muscle responses after TMS of the affected hemisphere. EMG responses are often used to observe the upper facial muscles, however, it is difficult to elicit by TMS, which often works by examining the motor cortex and recording the motor stroked potentials. At high stimulation strengths, this often excites the trigeminal sensory afferents and triggers a blink reflex. From the blink reflex, it contains the R1 ipsilateral and bilateral R2 component. The reflex can then be recorded in the lower parts of the brain. The R1 component limits the evaluation of the ipsilateral responses in the lower facial muscles.

== Treatment ==
Electromyographical biofeedback or myofeedback could provide patients who have central facial palsy the ability to create myo-electrical potentials that they can interpret. This method provides patients with information about muscle contraction that is normally subliminal. Electromyographical biofeedback enables the patient to regain control of muscles that are involved in facial expression that have been atrophied. Brener's model was one of the first models to describe the circuitry of the role of feedback for voluntary control of physiological processes. His method allows images of feedback that can produce effects on the voluntary control of motor responses, it involves two central systems: an effector mechanism and feedback loops. There are central systems that are the central sensory integration system and the central motor system. The interaction of both of these systems enables the central motor pathways and a central feedback loop that determine the activity of the effector system when it is innervated by the motor nerve (figure 1).

From this pathway, self instruction moves in a pattern that is called a response image. This response is often the actual movement of the directed response. Therefore, by knowing the loop, it allows full or dysfunctional proprioceptive feedback and exteroceptive control of the movement that is necessary in facial muscles.

=== Neuro developmental treatment ===
From the knowledge of the sensorimotor development a number of other automatic reactions were distinguished, such as balance, support and automatic adaptations of muscle power changes to postures. Patients with hemiplegia have movements that are lower level and less motor coordination, and often must relearn these movements to continue or gain normal automatic transitions in the body. Neuro developmental treatment (NDT) often improves daily functioning and self-help. This treatment centers on reversing disabilities, specifically for patients who are hemiplegic with impaired sensorimotor and neuropsychological functions. Muscle regulation that is disturbed, often called hypo or hypertonic, causes abnormal movement patterns. These automatic reactions are impaired, and patients must learn these movements and remember mentally and physically the positions.

NDT uses muscle power techniques through inhibiting and stimulating certain muscle groups, which aims to lower or increase muscle tone. For facial expression, therapists often help the patient make facial expressions by manipulating specific muscles with their fingers. The patient then tries to imitate the facial expressions. Speech therapy helps correct word pronunciation. NDT is directed at the functioning of the whole body, and not just the face. Understanding the direct mechanisms of the face is required to determine the dysfunction of specific muscles. NDT seems to be effective, but spontaneous motor movement that is controlled was not examined.

== Research ==
In one study, the lab group primarily focused on the electrophysiological evaluation of corticonuclear descending fibers to the lower facial motor neurons in patients with central facial palsy, and the discussion of how central facial palsy can become mild from various recovery techniques. It was found that in normal subjects unilateral TMS stimulation of the motor cortex induced EMG responses from the perioral muscles. This finding supports other studies in favor that bilateral projection of the corticonuclear fibers of the lower facial muscles are present in humans and primates with normal function. The study also found that ipsilateral corticonuclear fibers were found in the lower facial muscles, which does not coincide with other papers. The variation could be from the selection of muscles used in the study as well as the different electrodes that were used.

The orbicularis oculi muscles are often examined in patients with facial paralysis. In the study, it was difficult to elicit any corticonuclear EMG responses from this area in both normal subjects and in patients with CFP. This could be because the cortical links and synapses of the upper facial muscles are limited in function and TMS could not presynaptically stimulate the correct areas observed in paralysis. These areas are important because they stimulate the presynaptic terminals in cortical neurons. Also, this stimulation to the brain can not be studied on healthy human subjects. The upper facial muscle ME responses could not be innervated by TMS and the low threshold of blink reflexes often interferes with the nature of corticobulbar influences.
