= Nucleus ambiguus =

Group of motor neurons in the brain stem

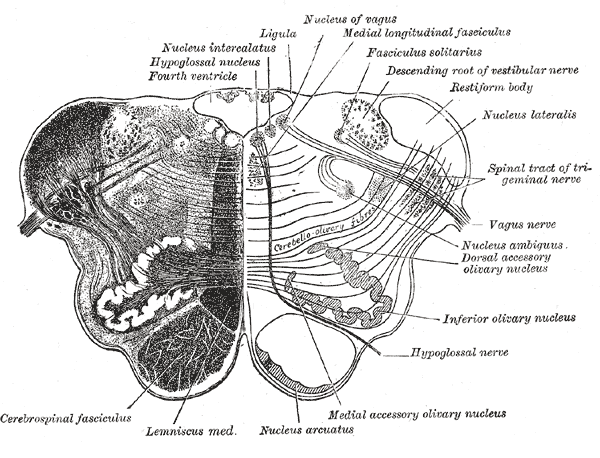
- Transverse section of medulla oblongata below the middle of the olive. ("Nucleus ambiguus" labeled at center right.)

Details

Identifiers
- Latin: nucleus ambiguus
- NeuroNames: 765
- NeuroLex ID: birnlex_2650
- TA98: A14.1.04.253
- TA2: 6011
- FMA: 54588

The nucleus ambiguus ("ambiguous nucleus" in English) is a group of large motor neurons, situated deep in the medullary part of the reticular formation named by Jacob Clarke. The nucleus ambiguus contains the cell bodies of neurons that innervate the muscles of the soft palate, pharynx, and larynx which are associated with speech and swallowing. As well as motor neurons, the nucleus ambiguus contains preganglionic parasympathetic neurons which innervate postganglionic parasympathetic neurons in the heart.

It is a region of histologically disparate cells located just dorsal (posterior) to the inferior olivary nucleus in the lateral portion of the upper (rostral) medulla. It receives upper motor neuron innervation directly via the corticobulbar tract.

This nucleus gives rise to the branchial efferent motor fibers of the vagus nerve (CN X) terminating in the laryngeal, pharyngeal muscles, and musculus uvulae; as well as to the efferent motor fibers of the glossopharyngeal nerve (CN IX) terminating in the stylopharyngeus muscle. In addition, it gives efferent fibers to the cranial part of accessory nerve (CN XI).

== Function ==
The nucleus ambiguus controls the motor innervation of ipsilateral muscles of the soft palate, pharynx, larynx, and upper esophagus. Lesions of nucleus ambiguus result in nasal speech, dysphagia, dysphonia, and deviation of the uvula toward the contralateral side. Preganglionic parasympathetic to the heart also flow through the external formation of the nucleus.

== Areas supplied ==
The muscles supplied by the vagus (included with this is the cranial root of the accessory nerve), such as levator veli palatini, are also necessary to swallow properly through integration by the nucleus of the solitary tract. The vagus also supplies the upper part of the esophagus, and other parts of the pharynx and larynx.

As well as motor neurons, the nucleus ambiguus in its "external formation" contains cholinergic preganglionic parasympathetic neurons for the heart. These neurons are cardioinhibitory. This cardioinhibitory effect is one of the means by which quick changes in blood pressure are achieved by the central nervous system (the primary means being changes in sympathetic nervous system activity, which constricts arterioles and makes the heart pump faster and harder). That is, through an integrated and antagonistic system with sympathetic outflow from the vasomotor center of the brainstem, the parasympathetic outflow arising from the nucleus ambiguus and dorsal motor nucleus of the vagus nerve acts to decrease cardiac activity in response to fast increases in blood pressure. The external formation of the nucleus ambiguus also sends bronchoconstrictor fibers to the bronchopulmonary system, which can produce reflexive decreases in pulmonary bronchial airflow. The pathophysiologic relevance of this system, which may act in concert with the cardioinhibitory system, is poorly understood, but likely plays a role in bronchospastic diseases like COPD/emphysema (in which inhaled anticholinergic medications such as Spiriva/tiotropium or ipratropium are standard-of-care treatment) and asthma, particularly for exercise-related asthma exacerbations, which may have a component of autonomic dysregulation.

== Additional images ==
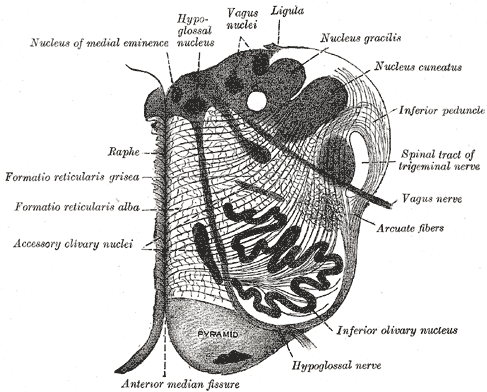
Section of the medulla oblongata at about the middle of the olive.

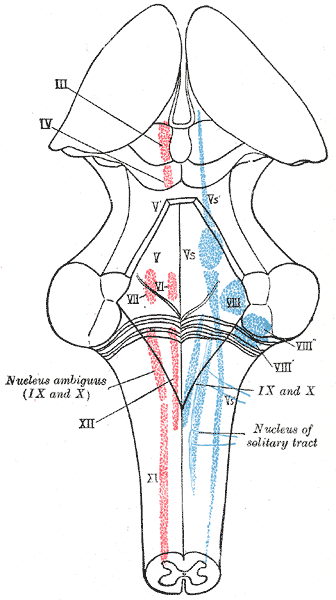
The cranial nerve nuclei are schematically represented; in dorsal view. Motor nuclei in red; sensory in blue.

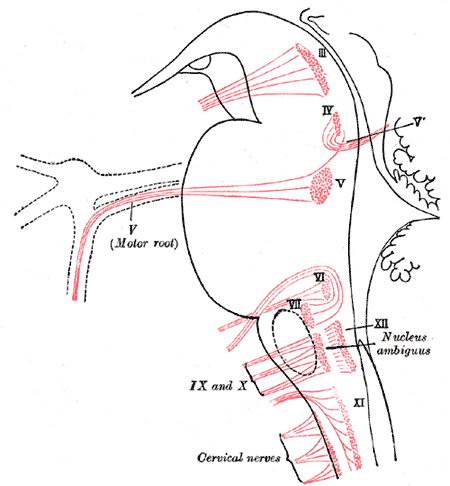
Nuclei of origin of cranial motor nerves schematically represented; lateral view.

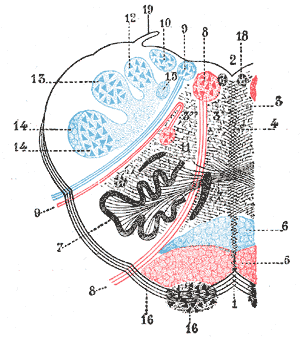
The formatio reticularis of the medulla oblongata, shown by a transverse section passing through the middle of the olive.

== See also ==
- Solitary nucleus
