= Brainstem stroke syndrome =

Brainstem stroke
- Specialty: Neurology

A brainstem stroke syndrome falls under the broader category of stroke syndromes, or specific symptoms caused by vascular injury to an area of brain (for example, the lacunar syndromes). As the brainstem contains numerous cranial nuclei and white matter tracts, a stroke in this area can have a number of unique symptoms depending on the particular blood vessel that was injured and the group of cranial nerves and tracts that are no longer perfused. Symptoms of a brainstem stroke frequently include sudden vertigo and ataxia, with or without weakness. Brainstem stroke can also cause diplopia, slurred speech and decreased level of consciousness. A more serious outcome is locked-in syndrome.

== Syndromes ==
- The midbrain syndromes (Significant overlap between these three syndromes)
  - Superior alternating hemiplegia or Weber's syndrome
  - Paramedian midbrain syndrome or Benedikt's syndrome
  - Claude's syndrome
- Medial pontine syndrome or Middle alternating hemiplegia or Foville's syndrome
- Lateral pontine syndrome or Marie-Foix syndrome
- Medial medullary syndrome or Inferior alternating hemiplegia
- Lateral medullary syndrome or Wallenberg syndrome

== History ==
A history of locked in syndromes.

=== Jean-Dominique Bauby ===
Parisian journalist Jean-Dominique Bauby had a stroke in December 1995, and, when he awoke 20 days later, he found his body was almost completely paralyzed; he could control only his left eyelid. By blinking this eye, he slowly dictated one alphabetic character at a time and, in so doing, was able over a great deal of time to write his memoir, The Diving Bell and the Butterfly. Three days after it was published in March 1997, Bauby died of pneumonia. The 2007 film The Diving Bell and the Butterfly is a screen adaptation of Bauby's memoir. Jean-Dominique was instrumental in forming the Association du Locked-In Syndrome (ALIS) in France.

== See also ==
- Alternating hemiplegia
- Posterior cerebral artery syndrome
- Middle cerebral artery syndrome
- Anterior cerebral artery syndrome
