= Raymond–Céstan syndrome =

- Other names: upper dorsal pontine syndrome,
- Basillar artery runs down the middle(in above image) and blockage is cause of this condition. Diagram of the arterial circulation at the base of the brain (inferior view).
- Diagnostic method: Cect/ncct brain, mri brain

Raymond–Céstan syndrome is caused by blockage of the long circumferential branches of the basilar artery. It was described by Fulgence Raymond and Étienne Jacques Marie Raymond Céstan. Along with other related syndromes such as Millard–Gubler syndrome, Foville's syndrome, and Weber's syndrome, the description was instrumental in establishing important principles in brain-stem localization.

== Presentation ==
- Ipsilateral ataxia and coarse intention tremor (damage to superior and middle cerebellar peduncle)
- Ipsilateral paralysis of muscles of mastication and sensory loss in face (damage to sensory and motor nuclei and tracts of CN V)
- Contralateral loss of sensory modalities in the body (damage to spinothalamic tract and medial lemniscus)
- Contralateral hemiparesis of face and body (damage to corticospinal tract) may occur with ventral extension of lesion
- Horizontal gaze palsy may occur (as in lower dorsal pontine syndrome)
