= Medial pontine syndrome =

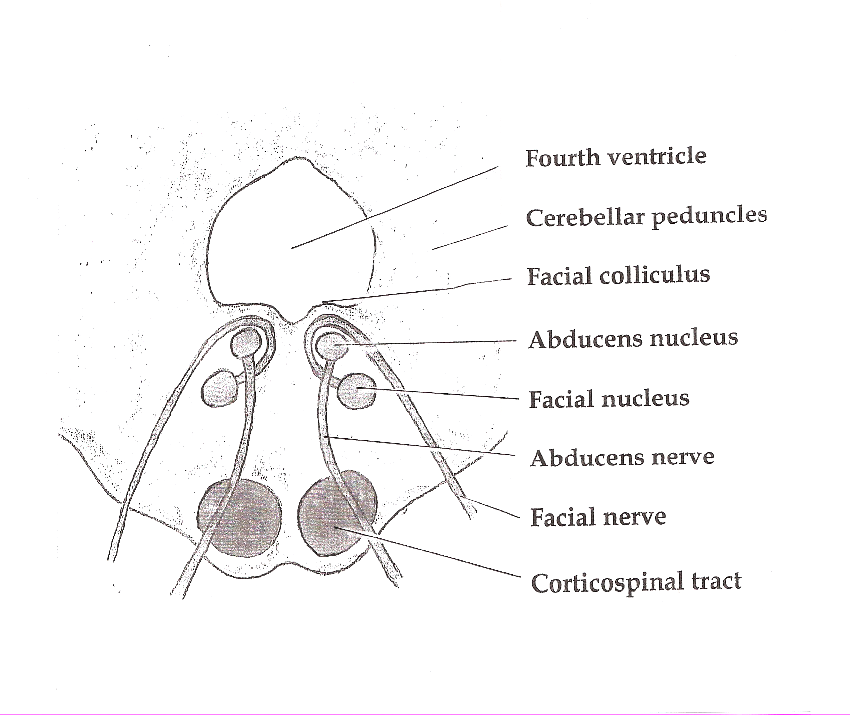
- Pons. (Medial pontine syndrome affects structures at the bottom of the diagram: the corticospinal tract, abducens nerve, and occasionally the facial nerve. Medial lemniscus is also affected, but not pictured.)
- Specialty: Neurology

Medial pontine syndrome or medial inferior pontine syndrome is a condition associated with a contralateral hemiplegia."Medial inferior pontine syndrome" has been described as equivalent to Foville's syndrome.

== Presentation ==
Although medial pontine syndrome has many similarities to medial medullary syndrome, because it is located higher up the brainstem in the pons, it affects a different set of cranial nuclei.

Structure affected	Presentation
Corticospinal tract	Contralateral spastic hemiparesis
Medial lemniscus	Contralateral PCML (aka DCML) pathway loss (tactile, vibration, and stereognosis)
Abducens nerve	Strabismus (ipsilateral lateral rectus muscle paralysis - the affected eye looks down and towards the nose). Abducens nerve lesion localizes the lesion to inferior pons.

Depending upon the size of the infarct, it can also involve the facial nerve.

== Cause ==
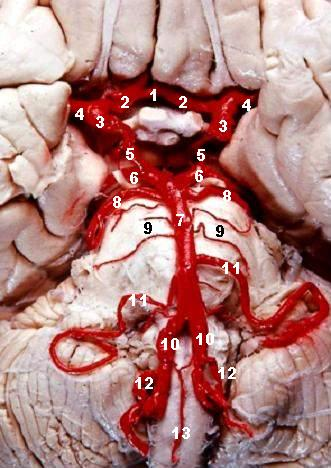
Human brainstem blood supply description. Basilar artery is #7, and pons is visible below it.

Medial pontine syndrome results from occlusion of paramedian branches of the basilar artery.

== See also ==
- Alternating hemiplegia of childhood
- Lateral medullary syndrome
- Lateral pontine syndrome
- Medial medullary syndrome
- Weber's syndrome
