= Étienne Jacques Marie Raymond Céstan =

French neurologist

Étienne Jacques Marie Raymond Céstan (6 April 1872, Gaillac – 1934) was a French neurologist.

From 1892 he studied medicine in Paris, and was subsequently a hospital interne and a student of Édouard Brissaud at the Salpêtrière. In 1899 he received his medical doctorate, and was chosen by Fulgence Raymond to be chef de clinique at the Salpêtrière. In 1903 he was put in charge of the histopathology laboratory, and during the following year, he obtained his agrégation. Soon afterwards, he moved to Toulouse, where in 1913 he attained the chair of psychiatry. At this position he conducted research on the development of cerebrospinal fluid and the effects of intra-ventricular injection.

== Medical terms ==
- "Céstan-Chenais syndrome" (named with Louis Jean Chenais): A brainstem syndrome that is a clinical amalgamation of Wallenberg’s or Avellis' syndrome and Babinski-Nageotte syndrome.
- "Céstan-LeJonne syndrome": synonymous with Emery–Dreifuss muscular dystrophy.
- "Raymond-Céstan syndrome": (named with Fulgence Raymond): Tumor of the cerebral peduncles that involves the red nucleus and causes speech disorders, palsy of lateral conjugate gaze, etc.

== Selected works ==
- Traité élémentaire de chirurgie et de technique opératoires (with Victor Chalot), 1893.
- Des hémorrhagies intrapéritonéales et de l'hématocèle pelvienne considérées particulièrement dans leurs rapports avec la grossesse tubaire. Pathogénie traitement, 1894.
- La thérapeutique des empyèmes, 1898.
- Trois observations de paralysie des mouvements associés des globes oculaires. Revue neurologique, Paris, 1901, 9: 70-77. (with F. Raymond).
- Sur un cas d’endothéliome épithéliale du noyau rouge. Revue neurologique, Paris, 1902, 10: 463-464. (with F. Raymond).
- Une myopathie avec rétractions familiales. Nouvelle iconographie de la Salpêtrière, Paris, 1902, 15: 38-52. (with N. J. LeJonne).
- Du myosis dans certaines lésions bulbaires en foyer (hémiplégie du type Avellis associée au syndrome oculaire sympathique). Gazette des hôpitaux, Paris, 1903, 76: 1229-1233. (with L. J. Chenais).
- Le syndrome protubérantiel supérieur. Gazette des hôpitaux, Paris, 1903: 823. (with F. Raymond).
