= Alternating hemiplegia =

- Specialty: Neurology

Alternating hemiplegia (also known as crossed hemiplegia) is a form of hemiplegia that has an ipsilateral cranial nerve palsies and contralateral hemiplegia or hemiparesis of extremities of the body. The disorder is characterized by recurrent episodes of paralysis on one side of the body. There are multiple forms of alternating hemiplegia, Weber's syndrome, middle alternating hemiplegia (Foville's Syndrome), and inferior alternating hemiplegia. This type of syndrome can result from a unilateral lesion in the brainstem affecting both upper motor neurons and lower motor neurons. The muscles that would receive signals from these damaged upper motor neurons result in spastic paralysis. With a lesion in the brainstem, this affects the majority of limb and trunk muscles on the contralateral side due to the upper motor neurons decussation after the brainstem. The cranial nerves and cranial nerve nuclei are also located in the brainstem making them susceptible to damage from a brainstem lesion. Cranial nerves III (Oculomotor), VI (Abducens), and XII (Hypoglossal) are most often associated with this syndrome given their close proximity with the pyramidal tract, the location which upper motor neurons are in on their way to the spinal cord. Damages to these structures produce the ipsilateral presentation of paralysis or palsy due to the lack of cranial nerve decussation (aside from the trochlear nerve) before innervating their target muscles. The paralysis may be brief or it may last for several days, many times the episodes will resolve after sleep. Some common symptoms of alternating hemiplegia are mental impairment, gait and balance difficulties, excessive sweating and changes in body temperature.

== Symptoms and signs ==
=== Superior alternating hemiplegia ===
Superior alternating hemiplegia (also known as Weber syndrome) has a few distinct symptoms: contralateral hemiparesis of limb and facial muscle accompanied by weakness in one or more muscles that control eye movement on the same side. Another symptom that appears is the loss of eye movement due to damage to the oculomotor nerve fibers. The upper and lower extremities have increased weakness.

=== Middle alternating hemiplegia ===
Middle alternating hemiplegia (also known as Foville Syndrome) typically constitutes weakness of the extremities accompanied by paralysis of the extraocular muscle, specifically lateral rectus, on the opposite side of the affected extremities, which indicates a lesion in the caudal and medial pons involving the abducens nerve root (controls movement of the eye) and corticospinal fibers (carries motor commands from the brain to the spinal cord).

=== Inferior alternating hemiplegia ===
Inferior alternating hemiplegia (also known as medial medullary syndrome) typically involves a "weakness of the extremities accompanied by paralysis of muscles on the ipsilateral side of the tongue (seen as a deviation of the tongue on that side on protrusion). These symptoms indicate a lesion in the medulla involving the corticospinal fibers in the pyramid and the exiting hypoglossal nerve roots.

== Causes ==
Note that this description is focused on alternating hemiplegia of childhood. Similar syndromes may develop following a brainstem infarction. The cause of alternating hemiplegia of childhood is the mutation of ATP1A3 gene. In a study of fifteen female and nine male patients with alternating hemiplegia, a mutation in ATP1A3 gene was present. Three patients showed heterozygous de-novo missense mutation. Six patients were found with de-novo missense mutation and one patient was identified with de-novo splice site mutation. De novo mutation is a mutation that occurs in the germ cell of one parent. Neither parent has the mutation, but it is passed to the child through the sperm or egg.

== Diagnosis ==
=== Criteria for diagnosis ===
First, the symptoms must be observed before the patient is 18 months of age. Second, there must be frequent episodes of hemiplegia, involving either side of the body. Third, other paroxysmal disorders including tonic attacks, dystonia, nystagmus, strabismus, dyspnoea, and other uncontrollable disorders are noticed to occur. Although common, the paroxysmal disorders involving the eye, nystagmus and strabismus, may not be apparent in older children and may not have been remembered in childhood so a lack of these symptoms does not rule out alternating hemiplegia. Fourth, all symptoms clear up directly after falling asleep and usually come back after waking during an attack. This occurrence is very indicative of alternating hemiplegia and as such those who display this are usually diagnosed with probable alternating hemiplegia. Fifth, indications of developmental delays, learning disability, or neurological irregularities are present. These issues may not be obvious in very young patients; however, it appears in almost all older patients. The final criteria before a diagnosis of alternating hemiplegia can be made is that all of these symptoms must not be due to another disorder. If the symptoms can be attributed to another disease or disorder, then a definitive diagnosis is difficult to make.

== Treatment ==
Medical treatment of hemiplegia can be separate into several different categories:

- prophylactic treatment by avoiding triggers and long-term drug treatment
- acute management of the episodes
- management of the epilepsy
- sleep as a management technique.

Seizure trigger include exposure to cold, emotional stress, fatigue, bathing, hyperthermia/hypothermia, and upper respiratory infection. A drug called flunarizine, which is a calcium channel blocker can help to reduce the severity and the length of attacks of the paralysis.

=== Flunarizine ===
Many children affected by alternating hemiplegia also have epilepsy. Seizures may occur during an attack but more often occur between attacks. Anti-epilepsy drugs are given to prevent or lessen the seizures, but the drugs often don't work and have severe side effects that require the patient to discontinue use. Flunarizine, which blocks calcium channels, is an antiepilepsy drugs used in 50% of patients, and has been shown to shorten the duration of attacks as well as reducing the severity of the attacks. While Flunarizine does not stop the attacks, it is the most common drug prescribed to treat those with alternating hemiplegia.

=== Sleep and diet ===
Sleep is also used as a management technique. An early indication of an episode is tiredness so medication such as melatonin or Buccal midazolam can be administered to induce sleep and avoid the episode. People with alternating hemiplegia are often underweight and with the help of dietitians, a meal plan should be developed for times of attack when consumption of food may be difficult.

== See also ==
- Hemiplegia
- Alternating hemiplegia of childhood
- Weber's syndrome
- Medial medullary syndrome
- Familial hemiplegic migraine
- Brain stem stroke syndrome
