= Cerebral infarction =

Stroke resulting from lack of blood flow

Cerebral infarct
- CT scan slice of the brain showing a right-hemispheric cerebral infarct (left side of image).
- Specialty: Neurology

Cerebral infarction, also known as an ischemic stroke, is the pathologic process that results in an area of necrotic tissue in the brain (cerebral infarct). Strokes are the leading cause of physical disability among adults, and the second leading cause of death worldwide. They are caused by disrupted blood supply (ischemia) and restricted oxygen supply (hypoxia). This is most commonly due to a thrombotic occlusion, or an embolic occlusion of major vessels which leads to a cerebral infarct. In response to ischemia, the brain degenerates by the process of liquefactive necrosis.

== Classification ==
There are various classification systems for cerebral infarcts, some of which are described below.

- The Oxford Community Stroke Project classification (OCSP, also known as the Bamford or Oxford classification) relies primarily on the initial symptoms. Based on the extent of the symptoms, the stroke episode is classified as total anterior circulation infarct (TACI), partial anterior circulation infarct (PACI), lacunar infarct (LACI) or posterior circulation infarct (POCI). These four entities predict the extent of the stroke, the area of the brain affected, the underlying cause, and the prognosis.
- The TOAST (Trial of Org 10172 in Acute Stroke Treatment) classification is based on clinical symptoms as well as results of further investigations; on this basis, a stroke is classified as being due to (1) thrombosis or embolism due to atherosclerosis of a large artery, (2) embolism of cardiac origin, (3) occlusion of a small blood vessel, (4) other determined cause, (5) undetermined cause (two possible causes, no cause identified, or incomplete investigation).

== Stroke recognition ==
There are many tests that can be done to prescreen a patient who may be showing stroke-like symptoms. No one test is better than the other and they all have room for improvement. One of these tests that is used by prehospital personnel is the Cincinnati Pre Hospital Stroke scale (CPSS). This test looks for facial droop, arm drift, and a change in the person's speech pattern. Another test that can be used and is a modification to the CPSS is the Face Arm Speech Test (FAST). This checks for facial weakness, arm weakness, and speech disturbances. The ROSIER (Recognition of Stroke in The ER), is a test used by an ER physician. In this test, the following seven items are each scored with a +1/-1 or 0 based on their presence or absence: loss of consciousness (-1), convulsive fit (-1), facial weakness (+1), arm weakness (+1), leg weakness (+1), abnormal speech patterns (+1), and visual defect (+1). The results are summed to get a total score between -2 and 5, with a score greater than zero indicating a probable stroke. In recent years, a study has been done to show how AI can aid in diagnosis of cerebral infarct and improve patient outcomes in areas that may not have stroke trained physicians.

== Symptoms ==
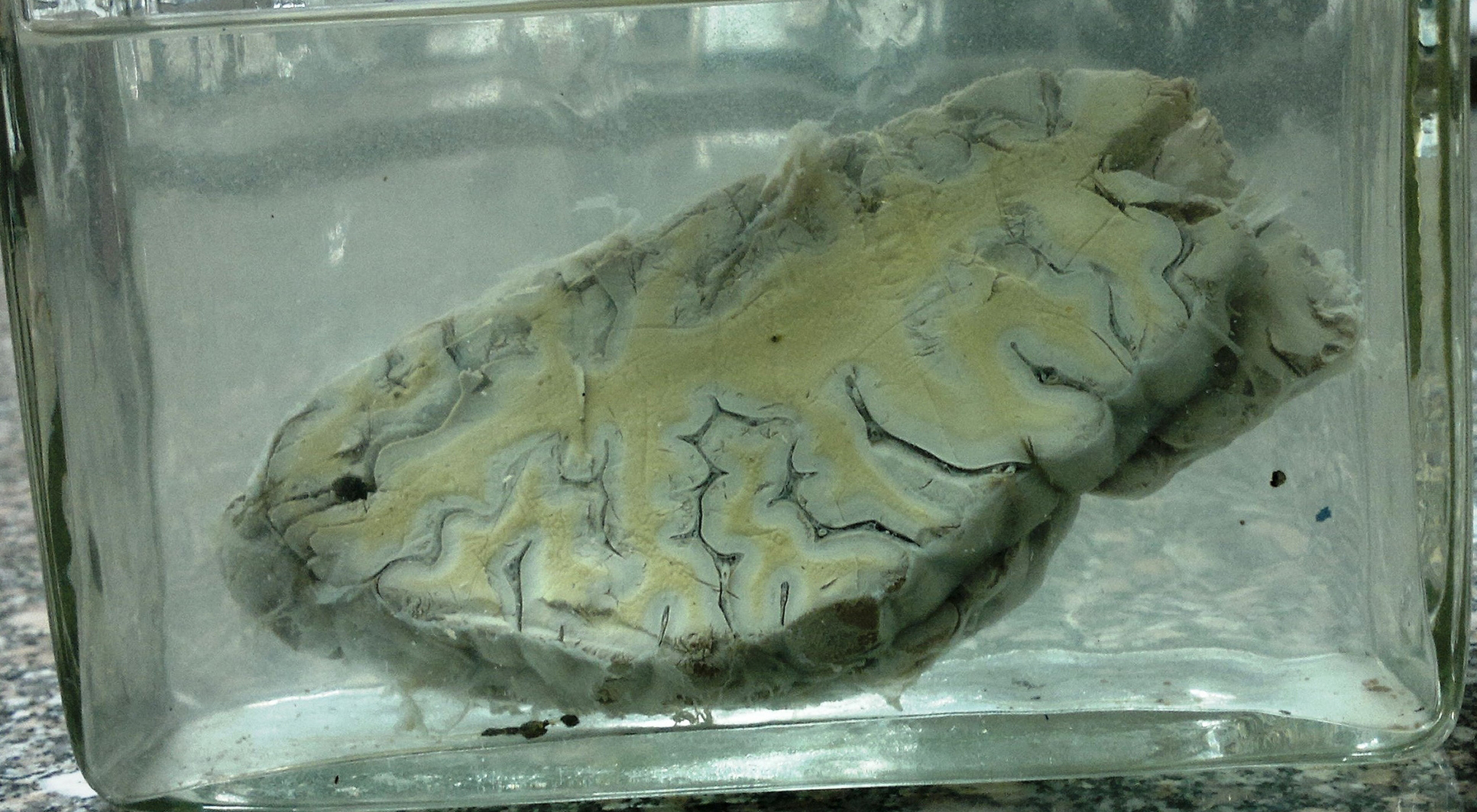
Cerebral infarction

Hemodynamic changes seen using an IOS camera specific for hemoglobin volume changes where we see the occlusion of a Middle Cerebral Artery (MCA) and how Spreading Depolarizations appear and spread over the cortex.

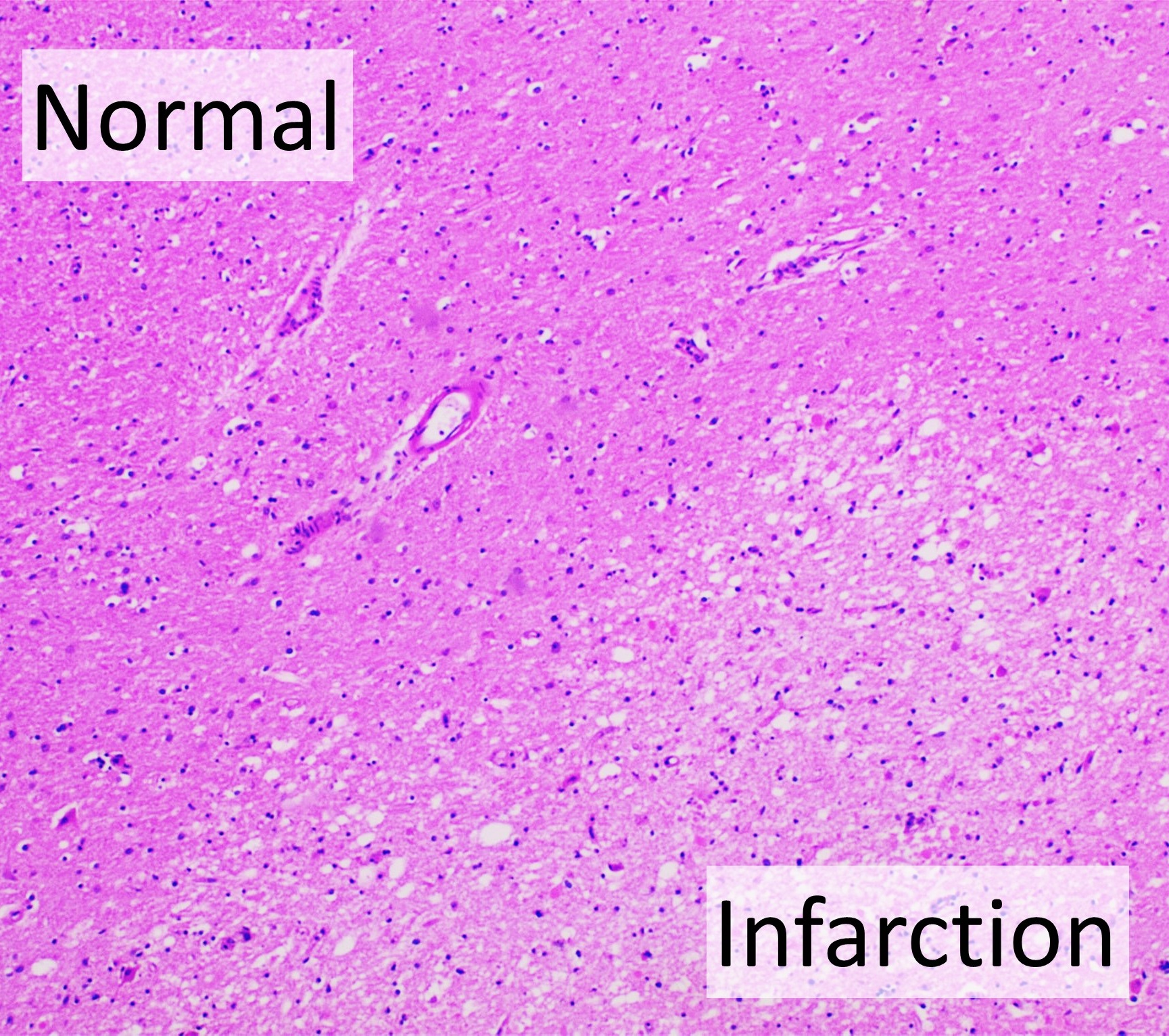
Histopathology at low magnification of a cerebral infarction on H&E stain, showing pallor in the infarcted area due to edema.

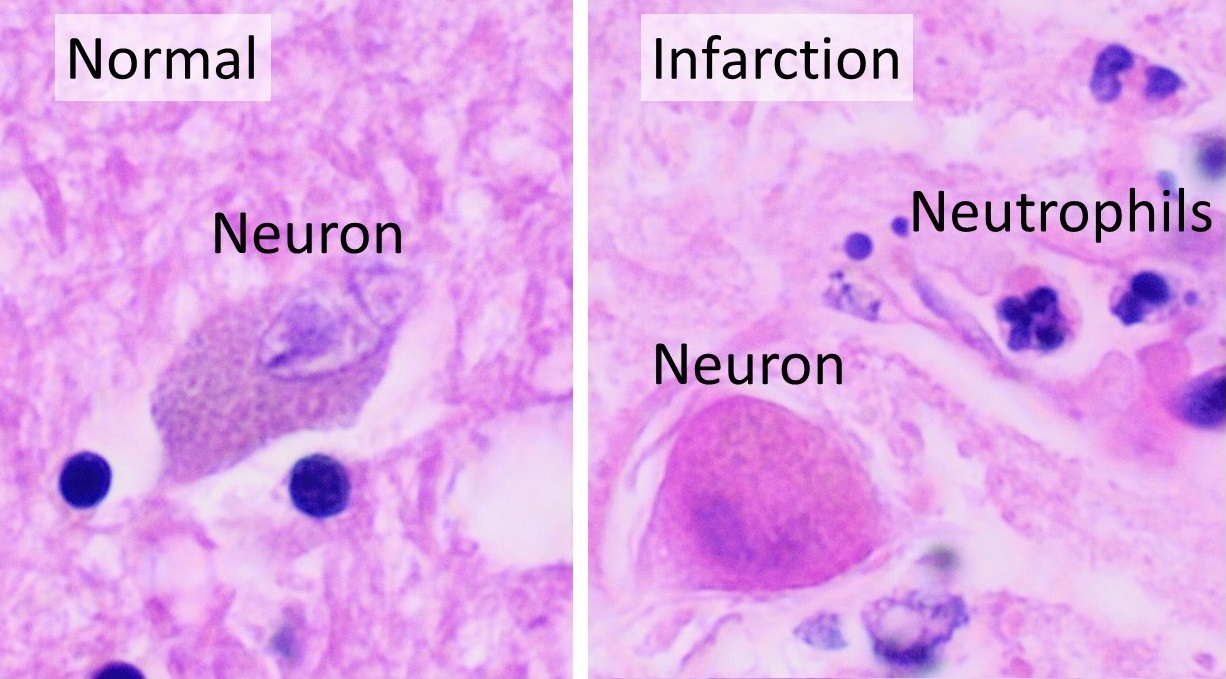
Histopathology at high magnification of a normal neuron, and a cerebral infarction at approximately 24 hours on H&E stain: The neurons become hypereosinophilic and there is an infiltrate of neutrophils. There is slight edema and loss of normal architecture in the surrounding neuropil.

Ischemic strokes usually present as a problem with brain or spinal cord function. Symptoms typically arise suddenly and may progress within minutes to hours. In rare cases, symptoms may appear gradually over a prolonged period of time, creating diagnostic difficulties. Most strokes occur without warning, but can be preceded by short-lasting stroke symptoms, known as a Transient Ischemic Attack (TIA). Common symptoms include one-sided weakness, facial paralysis or numbness, vision problems, trouble speaking, problems with walking and keeping balanced. A person can show one or more of these symptoms during a stroke. Decreased consciousness is more uncommon than in stroke due to intracerebral hemorrhage, but may be present when there are infarctions in more than one part of the brain or in the brain stem.

Symptoms of cerebral infarction can help determine which parts of the brain are affected. If the infarct is located in the primary motor cortex, contralateral hemiparesis is said to occur. With brainstem localization, brainstem syndromes are typical: Wallenberg's syndrome, Weber's syndrome, Millard–Gubler syndrome, Benedikt syndrome or others.

== Risk factors ==
Major risk factors for cerebral infarction are generally the same as for atherosclerosis. These include high blood pressure, diabetes mellitus, tobacco smoking, obesity, and dyslipidemia. There are also risks that a person cannot control. These include a person's age, family history of strokes, being African American, and being born a male. A person's risk of a stroke doubles each decade after the age of 55. The American Heart Association/American Stroke Association (AHA/ASA) recommends controlling these risk factors in order to prevent stroke. The AHA/ASA guidelines also provide information on how to prevent stroke if someone has more specific concerns, such as sickle-cell disease or pregnancy. It is also possible to calculate the risk of stroke in the next decade based on information gathered through the Framingham Heart Study.

== Pathophysiology ==
Cerebral infarction is caused by a disruption to blood supply that is severe enough and long enough in duration to result in tissue death. The disruption to blood supply can come from many causes, including:

1. Thrombosis (obstruction of a blood vessel by a blood clot forming locally)
2. Embolism (obstruction due to an embolus from elsewhere in the body),
3. Systemic hypoperfusion (general decrease in blood supply, e.g., in shock)
4. Cerebral venous sinus thrombosis.
5. Unusual causes such as gas embolism from rapid ascents in scuba diving.

Even in cases where there is a complete blockage to blood flow of a major blood vessel supplying the brain, there is typically some blood flow to the downstream tissue through collateral blood vessels, and the tissue can typically survive for some length of time that is dependent upon the level of remaining blood flow. If blood flow is reduced enough, oxygen delivery can decrease enough to cause the tissue to undergo the ischemic cascade. The ischemic cascade leads to energy failure that prevents neurons from sufficiently moving ions through active transport which leads the neurons to first cease firing, then depolarize leading to ion imbalances that cause fluid inflows and cellular edema, then undergo a complex chain of events that can lead to cell death through one or more pathways.

== Diagnosis ==
Computed tomography (CT) and MRI scanning will show damaged area in the brain. A CT scan will rule out a hemorrhagic stroke, is cheaper for the patient, and can be found in almost all hospitals unlike an MRI machine. Once the Doctor rules out a hemorrhagic stroke, rTPA can be given. An MRI can help to diagnose an acute cerebral infarct as quickly as 6 hours from start of symptoms, It can also help time when the stroke happened. The biggest problem with an MRI is it cannot be done on a patient with certain metallic implants or if the patient is claustrophobic. A head and neck CT angiogram can be performed within 6 hours of onset of symptoms to see where the occlusion may be located which can help in determining the cause of the stroke. In people who die from a stroke an autopsy can reveal additional diseases or conditions beyond the stroke itself, as well as uncover uncommon causes of a stroke.

== Treatment ==
In the last decade, similar to myocardial infarction treatment, thrombolytic drugs were introduced in the therapy of cerebral infarction. The use of intravenous rtPA therapy can be advocated in patients who arrive to stroke unit and can be fully evaluated within 3 hours of the onset. The quicker rTPA is started, the better the outcome for the patient.

If cerebral infarction is caused by a thrombus occluding blood flow to an artery supplying the brain, definitive therapy is aimed at removing the blockage by breaking the clot down (thrombolysis), or by removing it mechanically (thrombectomy). The more rapidly blood flow is restored to the brain, the fewer brain cells die. In increasing numbers of primary stroke centers, pharmacologic thrombolysis with the drug tissue plasminogen activator (tPA), is used to dissolve the clot and unblock the artery. Giving rTPA lessens the chance of disability after 3 months by 30%. Another intervention for acute cerebral ischemia is removal of the offending thrombus directly. This is accomplished by inserting a catheter into the femoral artery, directing it into the cerebral circulation, and deploying a corkscrew-like device to ensnare the clot, which is then withdrawn from the body. Mechanical embolectomy devices have been demonstrated effective at restoring blood flow in patients who were unable to receive thrombolytic drugs or for whom the drugs were ineffective, though no differences have been found between newer and older versions of the devices. The devices have only been tested on patients treated with mechanical clot embolectomy within eight hours of the onset of symptoms.

Angioplasty and stenting have begun to be looked at as possible viable options in treatment of acute cerebral ischaemia. In a systematic review of six uncontrolled, single-center trials, involving a total of 300 patients, of intra-cranial stenting in symptomatic intracranial arterial stenosis, the rate of technical success (reduction to stenosis of <50%) ranged from 90 to 98%, and the rate of major peri-procedural complications ranged from 4-10%. The rates of restenosis and/or stroke following the treatment were also favorable. This data suggests that a large, randomized controlled trial is needed to more completely evaluate the possible therapeutic advantage of this treatment.

If studies show carotid stenosis, and the patient has residual function in the affected side, carotid endarterectomy (surgical removal of the stenosis) may decrease the risk of recurrence if performed rapidly after cerebral infarction. Carotid endarterectomy is also indicated to decrease the risk of cerebral infarction for symptomatic carotid stenosis (>70 to 80% reduction in diameter).

In tissue losses that are not immediately fatal, the best course of action is to make every effort to restore impairments through physical therapy, cognitive therapy, occupational therapy, speech therapy and exercise.

Permissive hypertension - allowing for higher than normal blood pressures in the acute phase of cerebral infarction - can be used to encourage perfusion to the penumbra.
