= Watershed stroke =

Brain ischemia
- Other names: Watershed infarct
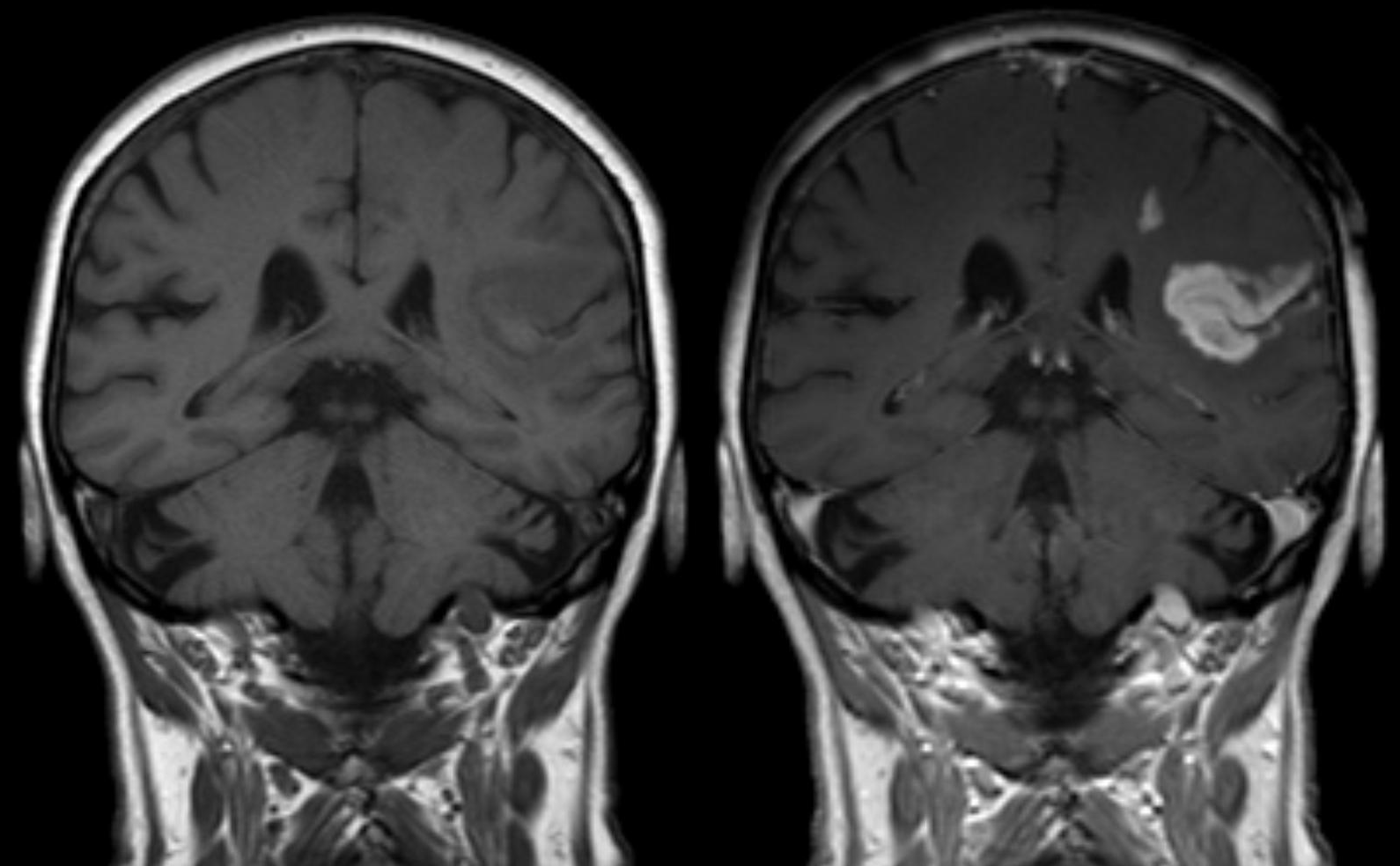
- T1 MRI of an ischemic stroke in the brain without (left) and with (right) contrast.
- Specialty: Neurology

A watershed stroke is defined as a brain ischemia that is localized to the vulnerable border zones between the tissues supplied by the anterior, posterior and middle cerebral arteries. The actual blood stream blockage/restriction site can be located far away from the infarcts. Watershed locations are those border-zone regions in the brain supplied by the major cerebral arteries where blood supply is decreased. Watershed strokes are a concern because they comprise approximately 10% of all ischemic stroke cases. The watershed zones themselves are particularly susceptible to infarction from global ischemia as the distal nature of the vasculature predisposes these areas to be most sensitive to profound hypoperfusion.

Watershed strokes are localized to two primary regions of the brain, and are termed cortical watersheds (CWS) and internal watersheds (IWS). Patients with many different cardiovascular diseases have a higher likelihood of experiencing a blood clot or loss of blood flow in border-zone regions of the brain. The resulting symptoms differ based on the affected area of the brain. A CT scan and MRI are used for diagnosis, and afterward several treatment options are available, including the removal of atherosclerotic plaque and a physical widening of the clogged blood vessel. Long-term care is focused around three areas: rehabilitative therapy, surgical interventions, and prevention of future watershed strokes. Going forward, research to combat watershed strokes is focusing on various topics, such as stem cell research.

== Signs and symptoms ==
Watershed stroke symptoms are due to the reduced blood flow to all parts of the body, specifically the brain, thus leading to brain damage. Initial symptoms, as promoted by the American Stroke Association, are FAST, representing F = Facial weakness (droop), A = Arm weakness (drift), S = Speech difficulty (slur), and T = Time to act (priority of intervention).

All strokes are considered a medical emergency. Any one of these symptoms, whether seen alone or in combination, should be assumed to be stroke until proven otherwise. Emergency medical help should be sought IMMEDIATELY if any or all of these symptoms are seen or experienced. Early diagnosis and timely medical intervention can drastically reduce the severity of a stroke, limit damage to the brain, improve the chances of a full recovery and reduce recovery times massively.

After the initial stroke, other symptoms depend on the area of the brain affected. If one of the three central nervous system pathways is affected, symptoms can include numbness, reduced sensation, and hyperreflexia.

Most often, the side of the brain damaged results in body defects on the opposite side. Since the cranial nerves originate from the brainstem, damage to this area can lead to defects in the function of these nerves. Symptoms can include altered breathing, problems with balance, drooping of eyelids, and decreased sensation in the face.

Damage to the cerebral cortex may lead to aphasia or confusion and damage to the cerebellum may lead to lack of motor movement.

Stroke presentations which are particularly suggestive of a watershed stroke include bilateral visual loss, stupor, and weakness of the proximal limbs, sparing the face, hands and feet.

== Causes ==
Watershed strokes are caused by ischemia or a lack of blood flow to the brain. There are several causes of ischemia, including embolism and atherosclerosis. There are several conditions that can predispose someone to watershed stroke by increasing the likelihood that insufficient blood supply will be able to reach the brain. Cancer and carcinomatosis as well as complications thereof and the treatments for them can also lead to stroke. People with many different cardiovascular diseases have a higher likelihood of experiencing a clot or a plaque that impedes flow through a blood vessel. Cardiovascular diseases that increase the risk of ischemia include:

- Congestive heart failure, which can lead to an inability to pump sufficient amounts of blood to the brain
- Atherosclerosis, which can cause a buildup of cholesterol plaques in the blood vessels, thereby decreasing the volume of blood that can flow through the vessel and reach the brain
- Angiopathy, a disease of the blood vessels
- Arterial hypotension, or low blood pressure in the arteries
- Hypertension, or high blood pressure
- Hyperlipidemia, or excessive cholesterol buildup in the blood vessels
- Diseases such as sickle cell anemia, which can lead to deformed red blood cells clogging blood vessels and impeding blood flow
- Carotid artery stenosis, or narrowing of the carotid artery which can decrease the volume of blood flow to the brain

== Pathogenesis ==
Although many imaging techniques are used to document watershed strokes, their pathogenesis remains controversial. It may involve various mechanisms such as systemic hypotension, microemboli, severe arterial stenosis, ICA occlusion or a combination of these.

=== Anatomy ===
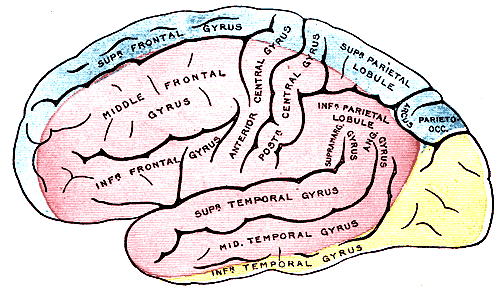
Outer surface of cerebral hemisphere, showing areas supplied by cerebral arteries. Pink is the region supplied by the middle cerebral artery, blue is supplied by the anterior cerebral artery and yellow is supplied by the posterior cerebral artery. Cortical watershed strokes occur at the borders between those areas.

These events are localized to two primary regions of the brain:

1. Cortical watershed strokes (CWS), or outer brain infarcts, are located between the cortical territories of the anterior cerebral artery (ACA), middle cerebral artery (MCA), and posterior cerebral artery (PCA).
2. Internal watershed strokes (IWS), or subcortical brain infarcts, are located in the white matter along and slightly above the lateral ventricle, between the deep and the superficial arterial systems of the MCA, or between the superficial systems of the MCA and ACA.

Nonetheless, within the literature itself, there exists confusion over the terminology used to describe cortical (outer brain) infarcts and subcortical (inner brain) infarcts. Besides watershed, border-zone is another common term used to refer to areas of the brain between the ends of two adjacent arteries. Other less used terms include: borderland, end zone, boundary zone, and terminal zone. These varying terms have arisen from the considerable anatomic variability both in the cerebral vascular structure and the territories of the brain that they supply.

=== Hypotension ===
A sharp drop in blood pressure is the most frequent cause of watershed infarcts. The most frequent location for a watershed stroke is the region between the anterior cerebral artery and middle cerebral artery. These events caused by hypotension do not usually cause the blood vessel to rupture.

=== Microemboli ===
Microemboli have not been experimentally proven to cause watershed strokes. It is unclear whether they are a cause or an effect of a watershed stroke. With watershed strokes, platelet aggregates block the small meningeal arteries in watershed regions creating a microembolism. Microemboli usually form as thrombi, and can block arteries outright. On the other hand, they often detach, move into blood circulation, and eventually block smaller downstream branches of arteries causing a thromboembolism. Generally, emboli travel as far outward as their size permits along the vascular branches of the brain. Using this hypothesis, microemboli are viewed as the cause of the infarct rather than secondary events. Nevertheless, secondary thrombi do form after infarcts, and therefore it has been difficult to distinguish between emboli and thrombi in watershed locations. The best supporting evidence is correlative; patients display subcortical abnormalities on CT scans and present more microembolic signals during a carotid endarterectomy.

Microemboli can be common in some high-risk patients, such as those with carotid stenosis. However, in healthier patients strokes do not usually result from microemboli.

=== Internal carotid artery occlusion ===
Internal carotid artery
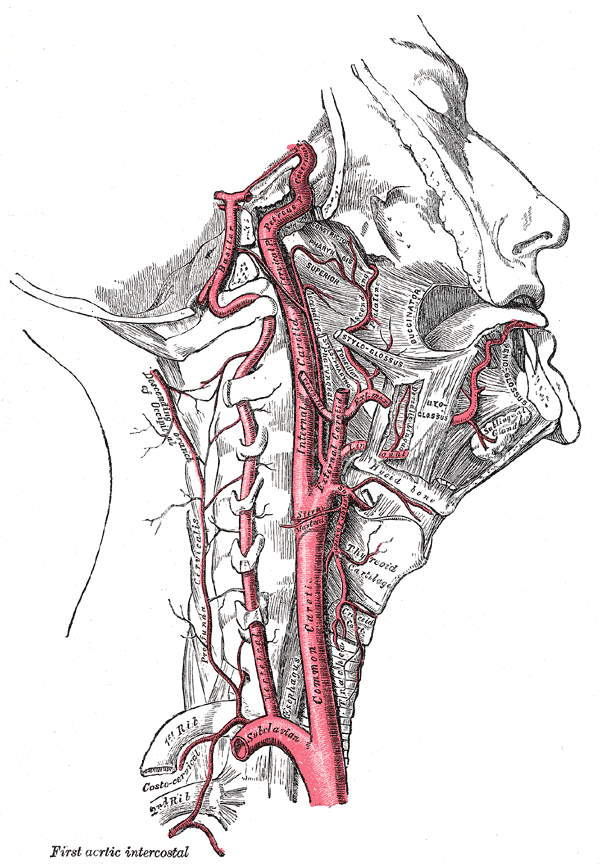
- Arteries of the neck. The internal carotid arteries arise from the common carotid arteries - labeled Common caroti on the figure.

Thrombi at the split of the internal carotid artery in the neck may cause watershed infarcts between the territories of the anterior cerebral artery and the middle cerebral artery. The resulting watershed infarcts in carotid artery blockages have mostly been considered to be due to a reduced blood flow, similar to that of hypotension. Imaging studies in severe internal carotid artery (ICA) disease report an incidence of watershed stroke ranging from 19% to 64%. Almost 40% of these watershed infarcts are attributed to narrowing of the carotid artery, which produces the reduced blood flow.

However, a different possible explanation has emerged. Alternatively, the vascular occlusion could be the result of microemboli from the carotid thrombi before the lumen becomes completely blocked. In this scenario, the clotting becomes too severe and the clot breaks free. The resulting traveling clot is known as an embolus (plural emboli). The wall of internal carotid artery just distal to the bifurcation (split) is a common site of atherosclerosis because of the unique hemodynamic effects caused by the blood flow divider. As a result, thrombi formation is more prevalent there. In general, researches have observed that this microembolization is a frequent phenomenon during the build-up of cerebral thrombi. The resulting emboli are pieces of calcified plaque. If these microemboli are 0.1 mm in diameter, they might pass into the small branches of the vascular system. There they may be destroyed by protective cellular defenses, or they may cause a stroke. Altogether, these considerations suggest that the watershed infarcts in carotid thrombosis are caused by microembolization from mural thrombi, thrombi adherent to the vessel wall, rather than by blood flow disturbances.

== Diagnosis ==
Diagnosis of a cerebral vascular accident begins with a general neurological examination, used to identify specific areas of resulting injury. A CT scan of the brain is then used to identify any cerebral hemorrhaging. An MRI with special sequences called diffusion-weighted MR imaging (DWI), is very sensitive for locating areas of an ischemic based stroke, such as a watershed stroke.

Further diagnosis and evaluation of a stroke includes evaluation of the blood vessels in the neck using either Doppler ultrasound, MR-angiography or CT-angiography, or formal angiography. An echocardiogram may be performed looking for a cardiac source of emboli. Blood tests for risk factors also may be ordered, including cholesterol levels, triglyceride levels, homocysteine levels, and blood coagulation tests.

=== Classification systems ===
- The Oxfordshire Community Stroke Project classification (OCSP, also known as the Bamford or Oxford classification) relies primarily on the patient's initial symptoms. Based on the extent of the symptoms, the stroke episode is classified as total anterior circulation infarct (TACI), partial anterior circulation infarct (PACI), lacunar infarct (LACI) or posterior circulation infarct (POCI). These four entities predict the extent of the stroke, the area of the brain affected, the underlying cause, and the prognosis.
- The TOAST (Trial of Org 10172 in Acute Stroke Treatment) classification is based on clinical symptoms as well as results of further investigations. In this diagnostic system, a stroke is classified as being due to
1. Thrombosis or embolism due to atherosclerosis of a large artery
2. Embolism of cardiac origin
3. Occlusion of a small blood vessel

== Treatment ==
=== Carotid endarterectomy ===
Often considered one of the safest ways to treat symptomatic carotid stenosis, carotid endarterectomy is a procedure by which a surgeon gently removes atherosclerotic plaque. Blood flow hopefully then returns to normal, increasing oxygen concentration to normal amounts in watershed areas of the brain.

There is the potential for complications, including disturbing portions of the plaque leading to a stroke or heart attack during or after surgery. Small risks of bleeding and infection exist as well.

=== Percutaneous treatments of carotid stenosis ===
In this type of procedure, a narrowed blood vessel is expanded via angioplasty or stenting. A thin angiography catheter is inserted in a large groin blood vessel and advanced to the stenosis. Percutaneous treatment is less invasive than endarterectomy, usually requiring only local anesthesia. Endarterectomy is still considered safer though, as percutaneous treatments can lead to accidental dislodging of plaque or even arterial rupturing.

==== Carotid angioplasty ====
During carotid angioplasty, an angiography cather with a small deflated balloon attached on the tip is advanced to a carotid stenosis. The ballon is then inflated slowly, forcing the narrowed portion of the vessel to expand.

==== Carotid stenting ====
Carotid stenting follows a similar procedure. Rather than using a balloon, a stent (metal mesh-like tube) is placed over the atherosclerotic plaque in the hopes of stabilizing it and allowing for increased blood flow to watershed portions of the brain.

== Prognosis ==
Watershed strokes are seldom fatal, but they can lead to neuromuscular degeneration, as well as dementia. This degeneration at the watershed regions of the brain can lead to difficulties with movement and motor coordination, as well as speech. Long-term care is focused around three areas: rehabilitative therapy, surgical interventions, and prevention of future watershed strokes.

=== Rehabilitative therapies ===
Long-term rehabilitative therapy for watershed stroke patients involves physical, occupational, and speech and language therapies. Physical therapy can be used to enhance motor function in the legs and arms that has been impacted by stroke. Occupational therapies can be provided to help to alleviate cognitive impairments that result from watershed stroke but its effectiveness remains unclear. Occupational Therapy can also be used in an effort to improve fine motor function that was damaged as a result of the stroke. Stroke can also cause impairments in speech production secondary to neurocognitive and neuromuscular impairments, and therefore speech and language therapies are often a component of long-term care for stroke patients. Intensive speech and language therapy has been shown to improve speech deficits associated with aphasia resulting from stroke.

=== Surgical interventions ===
Endovascular interventions, including surgical revascularization, can increase blood flow in the area of the stroke, thereby decreasing the likelihood that insufficient blood flow to the watershed regions of the brain will result in subsequent strokes. Neuroscientists are currently researching stem cell transplantation therapies to improve recovery of cebreral tissue in affected areas of the brain post-stroke. Should this intervention be proven effective, it will greatly increase the number of neurons in the brain that can recover from a stroke.

=== Prevention of future strokes ===
There are several interventions that are often used to help prevent the recurrence of a watershed stroke; namely, nutritional interventions, as well as antiplatelet, anticoagulant, and statin drug use. Nutritional interventions, including increased consumption of certain amino acids, antioxidants, B-group vitamins, and zinc, have been shown to increase the recovery of neurocognitive function after a stroke. Antiplatelet drugs, such as aspirin, as well as anticoagulants, are used to help prevent blood clots and therefore embolisms, which can cause watershed strokes. Statin drugs are also used to control hyperlipidemia, another risk factor for watershed stroke.

== Research ==
=== Stem cell transplantation ===
Ischemic stroke is still a major health concern and studies are being conducted to determine the pathway in which brain damage occurs to identify targets for intervention. Stem cell transplantation may help in intervention to improve cell recovery and regeneration.

=== Strokes after cardiac surgery ===
Although the mechanism is not entirely understood, the likelihood of a watershed stroke increases after cardiac surgery. An experiment conducted in a five-year span studied the diagnosis, etiology, and outcome of these postoperative strokes. It was observed that intraoperative decrease in blood pressure may lead to these strokes and patients who have undergone aortic procedures are more likely to have bilateral watershed infarcts. Furthermore, bilateral watershed strokes are associated with poor short-term outcomes and are most reliably observed by diffusion-weighted imaging MRI. Thus future clinical research and practice should focus on the identification of bilateral stroke characteristics. This identification can help discover affected areas and increase correct diagnosis.

=== Deep watershed infarcts ===
Hemodynamic impairment is thought to be the cause of deep watershed infarcts, characterized by a rosary-like pattern. However new studies have shown that microembolism might also contribute to the development of deep watershed infarcts. The dual contribution of hemodynamic impairment and microembolism would result in different treatment for patients with these specific infarcts.

=== Basilar artery (BA) stenting ===
While intracranial artery stenting is used for same side stroke prevention, basilar artery stenting may help to improve parallel, accessory blood flow. The stent may also lead to termination of recurrent middle cerebral artery (MCA) strokes.

=== Penumbra imaging ===
The area around the damaged ischemia is known as the penumbra. This viable area has the ability to regenerate with the help of pharmacological treatment however most patients with penumbra are left untreated. New research is being conducted in metabolic suppression, direct energy delivery, and selective drug delivery to help salvage this area of the brain after a stroke.

=== CLEVSRKNC peptide ===
CLEVSRKNC peptide, a new drug, has been shown to home to ischemic stroke tissue as well as apoptotic neuronal cells of the penumbra region. This discovery may help in creating selective drug delivery for stroke patients.

=== Liposomal drug delivery ===
Nanoliposomes are currently being researched for specific drug delivery due to their ph-sensitive and high blood–brain barrier diffusion characteristics. Many advantages of these drugs include:

1. Drugs can be maintained in the active state while encapsulated.
2. Being encapsulated provides direct access to target tissue
3. Prevention of non-specific binding
4. Allows for a high concentration of drug

Due to the fact that acidic environment and low blood flow are prominent characteristic of the penumbra area, liposomal drugs seem to be well suited.

== Terminology ==
Watershed strokes are named because they affect the distal watershed areas of the brain. The original terminology came from the German literature, which used the analogy of an irrigation system. The German scholars compared the blood flow in distal arterial territories of the brain to the last field on a farm, which was the area with the least supply of water and therefore most vulnerable to any reduction in flow. In a medical context, the term "watershed" refers to those areas of the brain that receive dual blood supply from the branching ends of two large arteries.
