= Claude's syndrome =

- Specialty: Neurology

Claude's syndrome is a form of brainstem stroke syndrome characterized by the presence of an ipsilateral oculomotor nerve palsy, contralateral hemiparesis, contralateral ataxia, and contralateral hemiplegia of the lower face, tongue, and shoulder. Claude's syndrome affects oculomotor nerve, red nucleus and brachium conjunctivum.

== Cause ==
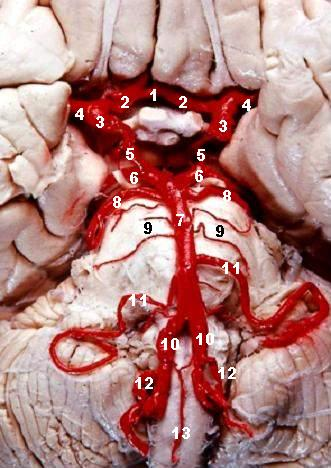
Human brainstem blood supply description. Posterior cerebral artery is #6, and midbrain is behind it.

Claude's syndrome is caused by midbrain infarction as a result of occlusion of a branch of the posterior cerebral artery. This lesion is usually a unilateral infarction of the red nucleus and cerebellar peduncle, affecting several structures in the midbrain including:

Structure damaged	Effect
dentatorubral tract fibers	contralateral ataxia
corticospinal tract fibers	contralateral hemiparesis
corticobulbar tract fibers	contralateral hemiplegia of lower facial muscles, tongue, and shoulder
oculomotor nerve fibers	ipsilateral oculomotor nerve palsy with a drooping eyelid and fixed wide pupil pointed down and out; probable diplopia

It is very similar to Benedikt's syndrome.

=== Other causes ===
It has been reported that posterior cerebral artery stenosis can also precipitate Claude's syndrome.

== History ==
It carries the name of Henri Charles Jules Claude, a French psychiatrist and neurologist, who described the condition in 1912.

== See also ==
- Wallenberg's syndrome
- Moritz Benedikt
