= Tacs =

Tacs or TACS may refer to:

- Training Assessment and Certification Scheme, the IRATA International training scheme for rope access technicians
- Total Access Communication System, a mostly-obsolete version of the AMPS mobile phone system formerly used in some European countries
- Theater Air Control System, the US Air Force's system of ground-based and airborne command and control elements for planning, executing, monitoring, and directing combat air operations
- Transcranial Alternating Current Stimulation (tACS), a non-invasive brain stimulation technique
- Total Anterior Circulation Stroke Syndrome, symptoms of a patient who appears to have suffered a total anterior circulation infarct, but who has not yet had any diagnostic imaging to confirm the diagnosis
- Tacs, the Hungarian name for Tonciu village, Galații Bistriței Commune, Bistriţa-Năsăud County, Romania
