= Vieusseux =

Vieusseux (French pronunciation: [vjøsø]) may refer to:

== People ==
- Gaspard Vieusseux (1746–1814), Swiss physician
- Giovan Pietro Vieusseux (1779–1863), Italian writer and editor
- Julie Vieusseux (1818–1878), Australian painter

== Other uses ==
- Gabinetto Vieusseux, a library in Florence, Italy, founded by Giovan Pietro Vieusseux

== See also ==
- Vieusseuxia, a genus of flowering plants
