= CardiacSense Ltd =

Israeli medical products company

- Industry: Medical products
- Founded: 2009
- Founder: Eldad Shemesh; Benny Batash; Avi Shitrit
- Headquarters: Caesarea, Israel
- Products: Wearables, medical device technology, heart arrhythmias, blood pressure
- Number of employees: 40
- Website: www.cardiacsense.com

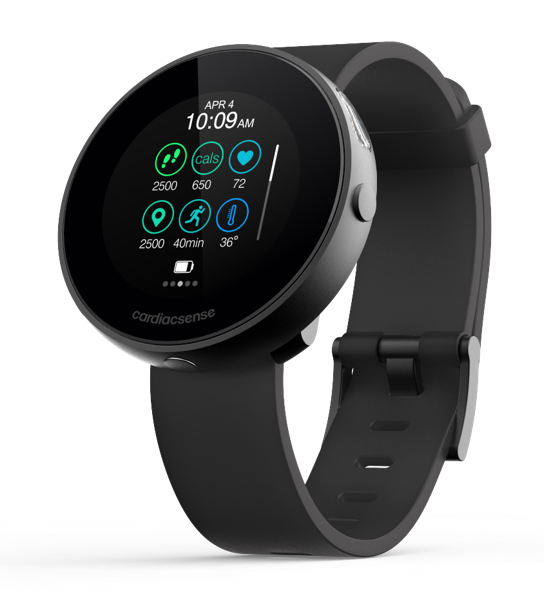
CardiacSense Watch

CardiacSense is a developer of a wearable technology for continuous cardiac arrhythmia detection and vital signs monitoring. CardiacSense is based in Caesarea, Israel.

== Overview ==
CardiacSense Ltd is a private limited company founded in 2009 as Sportracker. The company formerly developed a tracking device heart rate readings during sports activities. In 2015, the company changed its name to CardiacSense and refocused its activities on medical devices. CardiacSense's devices monitor heart rate to detect heart disorders such as atrial fibrillation tachycardia, bradycardia, PVCs, PACs, pause, and cardiac arrest. The device comes in the form of a wristwatch. It monitors heart rate (HR), heart rate variabilities (HRV), respiratory rate, blood pressure (continuously and cuff-less) as well as measures oxygen saturation (SpO2) and body temperature, skin temperature, and additional vital signs.

The watch can monitor and detect sleep apnea as well as Chronic Obstructive Pulmonary Disease (COPD) and Congestive Heart Failure (CHF) patients’ health condition deterioration.

== Technology ==
CardiacSense technology combines Electrocardiogram (ECG) and Photoplethysmography (PPG) sensors along with a unique mechanics, optics, and algorithm. The PPG is an optical sensing technique that measures changes in fluid (blood) volume. The company developed a proprietary optical solution and an artifact sensor that improve accuracy by eliminating all movement artifacts that affect the PPG sensor. The device has a continuous monitoring capability. In an Arrhythmia, such as Atrial Fibrillation, the watch alerts the user and sends messages to the patient's physician. The user's data is saved in the watch memory and uploaded to a cloud application via the user's cellular device.

In the United States, the watch will be issued by a prescription, and the physician can choose if and when to be notified.

The watch will not require a prescription in Europe and the rest of the world.

CardiacSense completed its first clinical trial at the Tel Aviv Sourasky Medical Center in 2016. Since then CardiacSense completed different multi-site clinical trials at the Tel Aviv Sourasky Medical Center, The Rambam Health Care Campus in Haifa and The Sheba Medical Center in Ramat Gan and in UCSF. The company is planning a series of new clinical trials in Israel and in the United States for respiratory rate, sleep apnea, oxygen saturation, and blood pressure.

== Capitalization ==
CardiacSense has raised ~25M$ million to date (May 2022). Rounds were: ~2M$ in (2010–2016), ~6.7M$ in (2017–2019), ~6.7M$ in (2019–2020), ~10M$ in (2021–2022).

== Regulatory ==
CardiacSense Ltd., a digital health company that developed the world’s most advanced, medically certified wearable device for monitoring vital signs, announced receipt of U.S.A. Food and Drug Administration (FDA) clearance of its CSF-3 watch for measuring Electrocardiogram (ECG), Beat-by-beat Heart Rate, and Oxygen Saturation of Arterial Hemoglobin (SpO_{2}).

The CSF-3 watch has already received CE approval from the Europe Medical Device Regulation (MDR) for four indications, including continuous monitoring of Atrial Fibrillation (AF). And beat-by-beat pulse rate by photo-plethysmography (PPG) which are unique CE regulatory approvals. Leveraging the CE mark, CardiacSense has begun commercialization of the medical grade CSF-3 watch in a dozen countries across Europe, Asia, and South America.

During 2023, the company plans to submit additional data to the FDA, much of which has already been generated, to support approval of additional indications. The company is in discussions with prospective USA commercial partners and expects to finalize agreements and launch in the US market in the second half of 2023.
