= Medial medullary syndrome =

- Other names: Inferior alternating syndrome
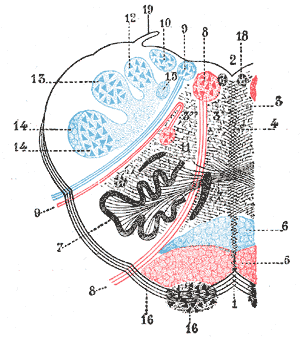
- Medulla oblongata, shown by a transverse section passing through the middle of the olive. (Medial medullary syndrome can affect structures in lower left: especially #5, #6, #8.)
- Specialty: Neurology
- Diagnostic method: Ipsilateral signs and symptoms – flaccid (lmn) paralysis and atrophy of one half of tongue (hypoglossal nerve) Contralateral signs and symptoms – spastic (umn) paralysis of trunk and limbs (contralateral corticospinal tract) Impaired tactile, proprioceptive, and vibration sense of trunk and limbs (contralateral medial lemniscus)

Medial medullary syndrome, also known as inferior alternating syndrome, hypoglossal alternating hemiplegia, lower alternating hemiplegia, or Dejerine syndrome, is a type of alternating hemiplegia characterized by a set of clinical features resulting from occlusion of the anterior spinal artery, leading to the infarction of the medial part of the medulla oblongata.

== Presentation ==
The condition usually consists of:

Description	Source of damage	Number on diagram
a deviation of the tongue to the side of the infarct on attempted protrusion, caused by ipsilateral muscle weakness.	hypoglossal nerve fibers	#8
limb weakness (or hemiplegia, depending on severity), on the contralateral side of the infarct	medullary pyramid and hence to the corticospinal fibers of the pyramidal tract	#5
a loss of discriminative touch, conscious proprioception, and vibration sense on the contralateral side of the infarct (body below head)	medial leminiscus	#6

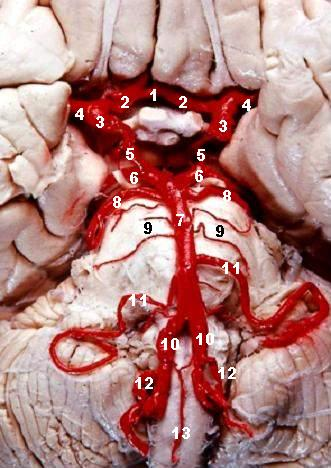
Human brainstem blood supply description. ASA is#13.

Sensation to the face is preserved, due to the sparing of the trigeminal nucleus.

The syndrome is said to be "alternating" because the lesion causes symptoms both contralaterally and ipsilaterally. Sensation of pain and temperature is preserved, because the spinothalamic tract is located more laterally in the brainstem and is also not supplied by the anterior spinal artery (instead supplied by the posterior inferior cerebellar arteries and the vertebral arteries).

== Pathophysiology ==
The anterior spinal artery arises bilaterally as two small branches near the termination of the vertebral arteries which descend anterior to the medulla and unite at the level of the foramen magnum. The infarction (which arises in the paramedian branches of the anterior spinal artery and/or the vertebral arteries) leads to death of the ipsilateral medullary pyramid, the medial lemniscus, and the hypoglossal nerve fibers that pass through the medulla. The spinothalamic tract is spared because it is located more laterally in the brainstem and is not supplied by the anterior spinal artery, but rather by the vertebral and posterior inferior cerebellar arteries. The trigeminal nucleus is also spared, since most of it is higher up in the pons, and the spinal part of it found in the medulla is lateral to the infarct.

== Diagnosis ==
- Ipsilateral signs and symptoms – flaccid paralysis (lmn) paralysis and atrophy of one half of tongue (hypoglossal nerve)
- Contralateral signs and symptoms – spastic (umn) paralysis of trunk and limbs (contralateral corticospinal tract)
- Impaired tactile, proprioceptive and vibration sense of trunk and limbs (contralateral medial lemniscus)

== Management ==
Medial medullary syndrome is managed similarly to other types of acute ischemic stroke. Management of central poststroke pain is an important element of managing medial medullary syndrome.

== See also ==
- Alternating hemiplegia of childhood
- Lateral medullary syndrome
- Lateral pontine syndrome
- Medial pontine syndrome
