= Watershed area (medical) =

Region of the body with dual blood supply from two large arteries' most distal branches

A Watershed area, in medical terminology, is a region of the body, that receives dual blood supply from the most distal branches of two large arteries. For example, the splenic flexure of the large intestine receives blood supply from the terminal branches of the superior mesenteric artery and the inferior mesenteric artery.

The term refers metaphorically to a geological watershed, or drainage divide, which separates adjacent drainage basins.

During times of blockage of one of the arteries that supply the watershed area, such as in atherosclerosis, these regions are spared from ischemia by virtue of their dual supply. However, during times of systemic hypoperfusion, such as in disseminated intravascular coagulation or heart failure, these regions are particularly vulnerable to ischemia because they are supplied by the most distal branches of their arteries, and thus the least likely to receive sufficient blood.

Watershed areas are found in the brain, where areas are perfused by both the anterior and middle cerebral arteries, and in the intestines, where areas are perfused by both the superior and inferior mesenteric arteries (i.e., splenic flexure). Additionally, the sigmoid colon and rectum form a watershed zone with blood supply from inferior mesenteric, pudendal and iliac circulations. Hypoperfusion in watershed areas can lead to mural and mucosal infarction in the case of ischemic bowel disease. When watershed stroke occurs in the brain, it produces unique focal neurologic symptoms that aid clinicians in diagnosis and localization. For example, a cerebral watershed area is situated in the dorsal prefrontal cortex; when it is affected on the left side, this can lead to transcortical motor aphasia.
