= Adolf Wallenberg =

German internist and neurologist

- Born: 10 November 1862; Preussisch Stargard
- Died: 10 April 1949 (aged 86); Manteno, Illinois, United States
- Education: University of Heidelberg, University of Leipzig
- Years active: 1886–1928
- Known for: Wallenberg's syndrome
- Medical career
- Profession: Internist, neurologist
- Institutions: Städtisches Krankenhaus, Danzig
- Notable works: Jahresberichte über die Leistungen auf dem Gebiete der Anatomie des Zentralnervensystems

Adolf Wallenberg (10 November 1862 – 10 April 1949) was a German internist and neurologist.

Wallenberg was born in Preussisch Stargard into a Jewish family. He studied at the universities of Heidelberg and Leipzig, receiving his doctorate from the latter institution in 1886. From 1886 to 1888 he worked as an assistant in the Städtisches Krankenhaus in Danzig, where he settled as a practitioner. From 1907 to 1928 he served as director of the internal medicine department at the hospital, attaining the title of professor in 1910. When the Nazis came to power, he was stripped of his research laboratory and forced to stop working because he was Jewish. He emigrated to Great Britain in 1938, then relocated to the United States in 1943, where he died several years later in Manteno, Illinois.

While working with Ludwig Edinger he described the avian brain, and also examined the role of the olfactory system in the assessment, recognition, and ingestion of food.

He described the clinical manifestations (1895) and the autopsy findings (1901) in occlusions of the arteria cerebelli posterior inferior (Wallenberg's syndrome).

With Edinger, and later alone, he published the "Jahresberichte über die Leistungen auf dem Gebiete der Anatomie des Zentralnervensystems" (1895–1928). From 1996 until 2019 the "Adolf Wallenberg-Preis" was awarded by the Deutsche Gesellschaft für Neurologie for outstanding contributions made in the field of cerebrovascular disease, cerebral hemorrhage or cerebral metabolism.

== Associated eponym ==
- Wallenberg's syndrome: (Synonyms: dorsolateral medullary syndrome, lateral bulbar syndrome, lateral medullary infarction syndrome, posteroinferior cerebellar artery syndrome): A complex of symptoms caused by occlusion of the posterior inferior cerebellar artery, resulting in sensory and sympathetic disturbances, cerebellar ataxy, etc.
