= Brain ischemia =

Insufficient bloodflow to the brain

- Other names: Cerebral ischemia, cerebrovascular ischemia
- Specialty: Neurology, cardiology

Brain ischemia is a condition in which there is insufficient bloodflow to the brain to meet metabolic demand. This leads to poor oxygen supply in the brain and may be temporary such as in transient ischemic attack or permanent in which there is death of brain tissue such as in cerebral infarction (ischemic stroke).

The symptoms of brain ischemia reflect the anatomical region undergoing blood and oxygen deprivation, and may involve impairments in vision, body movement, and speaking.

An interruption of blood flow to the brain for more than 10 seconds causes unconsciousness, and an interruption in flow for more than a few minutes generally results in irreversible brain damage. In 1974, Hossmann and Zimmermann demonstrated that ischemia induced in mammalian brains for up to an hour can be at least partially recovered. Accordingly, this discovery raised the possibility of intervening after brain ischemia before the damage becomes irreversible.

== Symptoms and signs ==
The clinical presentation of brain ischemia varies depending on the affected vascular territory. Ischemia in the anterior circulation, particularly branches of the internal carotid artery, may present with unilateral weakness, speech disturbances, or visual loss in one eye (amaurosis fugax).Posterior circulation ischemia, involving the vertebrobasilar arteries, often leads to symptoms such as vertigo, diplopia, dysarthria, or bilateral motor deficits.Transient symptoms may indicate a TIA, while prolonged or severe cases may progress to permanent deficits due to cerebral infarction. Sudden loss of consciousness can occur when cerebral blood flow ceases for over 10 seconds, and irreversible brain damage generally follows within minutes.

== Causes and Risk Factors ==
Brain ischemia results from conditions that reduce or block cerebral blood flow. Common causes of focal ischemia include arterial thrombosis due to atherosclerosis, embolism from cardiac sources such as atrial fibrillation, and small vessel disease associated with hypertension or diabetes. Global ischemia usually arises from systemic hypoperfusion following cardiac arrest or severe hypotension. Additional risk factors include smoking, hyperlipidemia, advanced age, and a history of TIA or stroke. Rare etiologies include sickle cell anemia, which promotes vascular occlusion, and Moyamoya disease, a progressive cerebrovascular disorder affecting the intracranial arteries.

== Pathophysiology ==
When blood supply to the brain is compromised, neurons are deprived of oxygen and glucose necessary for aerobic metabolism. This leads to rapid depletion of adenosine triphosphate (ATP) within minutes. The failure of ATP-dependent ion pumps disrupts electrochemical gradients, resulting in cellular depolarization and an influx of calcium. Elevated intracellular calcium triggers glutamate release, proteolysis, and ultimately, neuronal injury. Surrounding the infarcted core is the 'ischemic penumbra,' a zone of hypoperfused tissue that retains some metabolic activity and may be salvageable with timely intervention.

== Diagnosis ==
Diagnosis of brain ischemia begins with prompt clinical assessment of neurological deficits, often using tools such as the NIH Stroke Scale. Immediate brain imaging is essential to confirm ischemia and exclude hemorrhage. Noncontrast computed tomography (CT) is typically the first step due to its availability and speed. Magnetic resonance imaging (MRI) with diffusion-weighted imaging offers higher sensitivity for detecting acute ischemia. Additional studies, including CT or MR angiography and carotid Doppler ultrasound, help identify vascular occlusions or stenosis. Cardiac evaluation, such as echocardiography and ECG monitoring, may be necessary in cases with suspected embolic sources.

=== Focal brain ischemia ===
Focal brain ischemia occurs when a blood clot has occluded a cerebral vessel. Focal brain ischemia reduces blood flow to a specific brain region, increasing the risk of cell death to that particular area. It can be either caused by thrombosis or embolism.

=== Global brain ischemia ===
Global brain ischemia occurs when blood flow to the brain is halted or drastically reduced. This is commonly caused by cardiac arrest. If sufficient circulation is restored within a short period of time, symptoms may be transient. However, if a significant amount of time passes before restoration, brain damage may be permanent. While reperfusion may be essential to protecting as much brain tissue as possible, it may also lead to reperfusion injury. Reperfusion injury is classified as the damage that ensues after restoration of blood supply to ischemic tissue. Carotid artery stenosis may cause focal brain ischemia through artery-to-artery embolism or global brain ischemia if very severe stenosis with limited to no blood flow through the carotid artery.

Due to different susceptibility to ischemia of various brain regions, a global brain ischemia may cause focal brain infarction. The cerebral cortex and striatum are more susceptible than the thalamus, and the thalamus in turn is more sensitive than the brainstem. Partial cerebral cortex infarction from global brain ischemia typically manifests as watershed stroke.

The outcome of brain ischemia is influenced by the quality of subsequent supportive care. Systemic blood pressure (or slightly above) should be maintained so that cerebral blood flow is restored. Also, hypoxaemia and hypercapnia should be avoided. Seizures can induce more damage; accordingly, anticonvulsants should be prescribed and should a seizure occur, aggressive treatment should be undertaken. Hyperglycaemia should also be avoided during brain ischemia.

A closely related disease to brain ischemia is brain hypoxia. Brain hypoxia is the condition in which there is a decrease in the oxygen supply to the brain even in the presence of adequate blood flow. If hypoxia lasts for long periods of time, coma, seizures, and even brain death may occur. Symptoms of brain hypoxia are similar to ischemia and include inattentiveness, poor judgment, memory loss, and a decrease in motor coordination. Potential causes of brain hypoxia are suffocation, carbon monoxide poisoning, severe anemia, and use of drugs such as cocaine and other amphetamines. Other causes associated with brain hypoxia include drowning, strangling, choking, cardiac arrest, head trauma, and complications during general anesthesia. Treatment strategies for brain hypoxia vary depending on the original cause of injury, primary and/or secondary.

=== Management and Treatment ===
Treatment of brain ischemia depends on the type, location, and timing of the event. For acute ischemic stroke, intravenous thrombolysis with tissue plasminogen activator (tPA) is recommended within 4.5 hours of symptom onset. In patients with large vessel occlusions, endovascular mechanical thrombectomy offers substantial benefits when performed within 6 to 24 hours, particularly if imaging shows viable penumbral tissue. Supportive care includes blood pressure optimization, oxygenation, and management of complications such as fever and seizures. In global ischemia due to cardiac arrest, targeted temperature management (32–36 °C) may improve neurologic outcomes. Long-term care focuses on secondary prevention through antithrombotic therapy, control of vascular risk factors, and rehabilitation.

=== Prognosis and Outcomes ===
The clinical outcome of brain ischemia depends on the extent of injury, time to treatment, and patient comorbidities. Rapid reperfusion has been associated with significantly improved functional recovery and reduced mortality. However, delayed treatment or severe ischemia often results in long-term neurological deficits, including motor impairment, aphasia, and cognitive dysfunction. Approximately one-third of ischemic stroke survivors experience significant disability. In cases of global ischemia, outcomes are heavily influenced by the duration of cerebral hypoperfusion and the quality of post-resuscitation care. Vascular depression and vascular dementia may develop after multiple subcortical ischemic insults, particularly in older adults.
