= Gaspard Vieusseux =

Gaspard Vieusseux (February 18, 1746 – October 21, 1814) was a physician from the Republic of Geneva, born in Geneva.

In 1766 he obtained his doctorate from the University of Leiden, and subsequently returned to Geneva in order to practice medicine.

Vieusseux is remembered for his pioneer work with neurological disorders. In 1806 he provided an early clinical description of bacterial meningitis — this being in regards to an 1805 epidemic of the disease in the vicinity of Geneva. In 1887 Anton Weichselbaum (1845–1920) of Vienna isolated the agent of meningitis, now known as meningococcus.

In 1808 he provided the first clinical description of lateral medullary infarction to the Société médicochirugicale de Genève, and in 1810 described this condition to the Medical and Chirurgical Society of London. However, this disease was later to become known as "Wallenberg's syndrome", named after neurologist Adolf Wallenberg (1862–1949), who in 1901 provided a precise anatomical description of the disorder from an autopsy. Vieusseux also distinguished himself as an early advocate of vaccinations for treatment against smallpox.
