= Hermann David Weber =

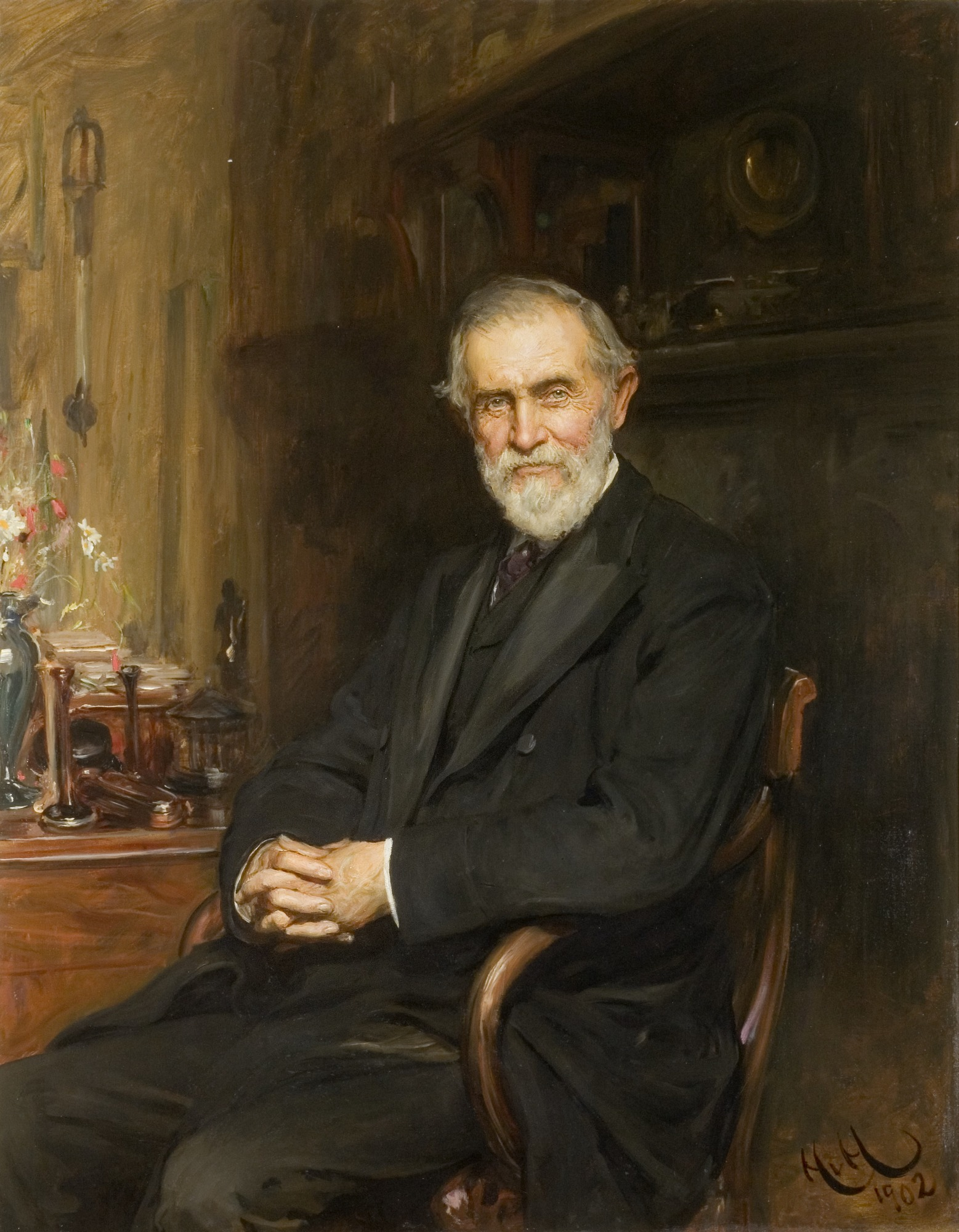
- Hermann David Weber by Hubert von Herkomer, 1902
- Born: 30 December 1823; Holzkirchen, Germany
- Died: 11 November 1918 (aged 94); London, England, UK
- Known for: Weber's syndrome
- Scientific career
- Fields: Medicine

Sir Hermann David Weber FRCP (30 December 1823 – 11 November 1918) was a German physician who practised medicine in England.

== Early life and education ==
Hermann David Weber was born at Holzkirchen, Upper Bavaria, on 30 December 1823.

He attended gymnasium (high school) in Fulda, Hesse, in 1838. He started his medical studies at Marburg University in 1844, graduating from the University of Bonn in 1848.

== Career ==
Around 1854, Weber attended Guy's Hospital in London. He was then appointed to a position at the German Hospital in Dalston, London.

After retirement as a hospital physician in 1890 at the age of 80, he continued to serve as consulting physician to the Royal National Hospital for Consumption at Ventnor on the Isle of Wight, and to the North London Hospital for Consumption and Diseases of the Chest (now Mount Vernon Hospital), as well as to the German Hospital and the King Edward VII Sanatorium in Midhurst, West Sussex. He was also consulting physician and German embassy physician in London.

== Other activities ==
Weber was an avid coin collector, and assembled a significant collection of Greek coins. He became a member of the Royal Numismatic Society in 1883, serving on its Council from 1889 to 1906, including as vice-president for some time.

He served on the RCP Council for five years, including stints as Censor in 1879 and 1880.

== Honours and awards ==
Weber became a member of the Royal College of Physicians (RCP) in 1855, and was elected a fellow of the RCP in 1859.

Based on his pioneering work on open-air treatment of tuberculosis, he was knighted by Queen Victoria in 1899.

He was awarded the medal of the Royal Numismatic Society in 1905.

== Personal life ==
Weber married an Englishwoman, Matilda Gruning, in 1854, and had children. His son, Frederick Parkes Weber, was also a physician and coin collector. Another son, Frank Weber, was an officer in the Royal Artillery.

== Death and legacy ==
In 1895 Weber gave the RCP a donation of £3,000 to create a prize to be awarded triennially for the best essay on tuberculosis, in memory of his friend Edmund Parkes. This has continued into the 21st century as the Weber-Parkes Prize.

Weber died on 11 November 1918.

Weber's syndrome is named after him.

== Selected publications ==
- The Spas and Mineral Waters of Europe (with Frederick Parkes Weber, 1896)
- On Means for the Prolongation of Life (1906)
