= Moritz Benedikt =

Hungarian-Austrian neurologist

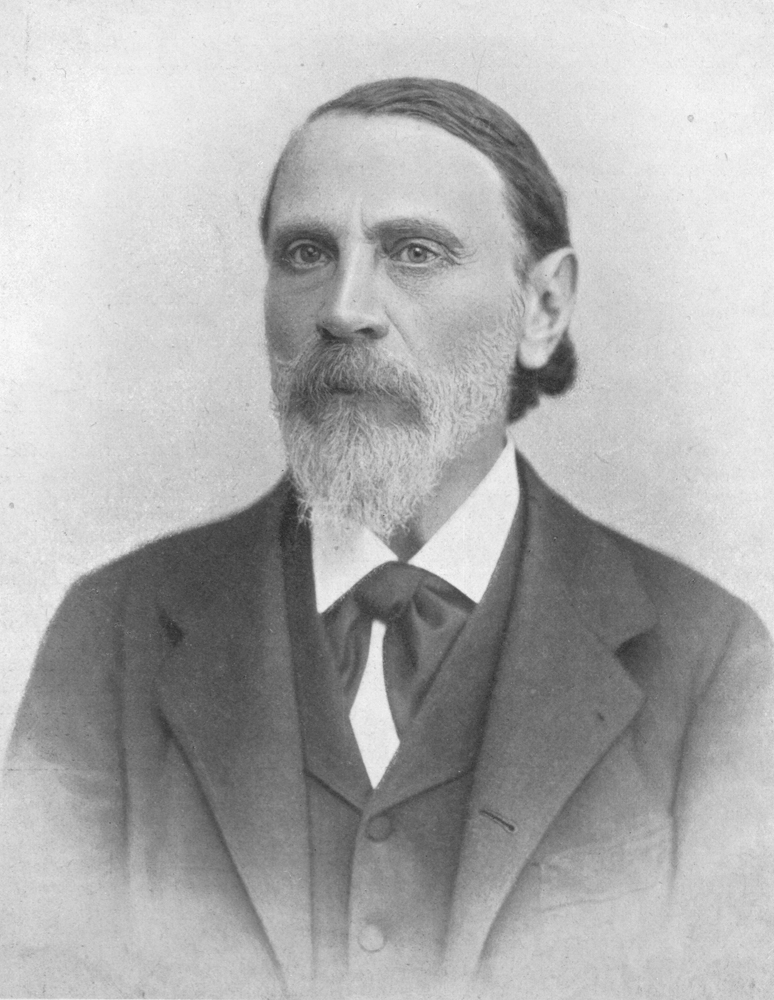
- Born: July 4, 1835; Eisenstadt, Sopron County, Kingdom of Hungary
- Died: April 14, 1920 (aged 84); Vienna, Austria
- Occupation: Neurologist
- Known for: controversial research in criminal anthropology
- Medical career
- Profession: Physician, Professor
- Institutions: University of Vienna
- Sub-specialties: electrotherapeutics and neuropathology

Moritz Benedikt also spelt Moriz (4 July 1835, in Eisenstadt, Sopron County – 14 April 1920, in Vienna) was a neurologist who worked in Austria-Hungary.

== Early life and education ==
He was born in Eisenstadt in Hungary. He got his medical education in Vienna, where he studied under Hyrtl, Briicke, Skoda, Oppolzer, Rokitansky and other well-known teachers, and qualified in 1859.

== Career ==
He was an instructor and professor of neurology at the University of Vienna. Benedikt was a physician with the Austrian army during the Second Italian War of Independence (1859) and the Austro-Prussian War.

Benedikt was a specialist in the fields of electrotherapeutics and neuropathology. His name is lent to the eponymous "Benedikt's syndrome", a disease characterized by ipsilateral oculomotor paralysis with contralateral tremor and hemiparesis caused by a lesion involving the red nucleus and corticospinal tract in the midbrain tegmentum.

== Legacy ==
Benedikt is remembered today for his controversial research in criminal anthropology. He performed numerous cephalometric studies, and postulated that there were specific differences between "normal" and "criminal brains". He explained his research on the subject in a book titled "Anatomical Studies upon the Brains of Criminals" (title of English translation).

Benedikt is credited for coining the word "darsonvalisation" to describe therapeutic or experimental applications of pulsed high frequency (110–400 kHz) high voltage (around 10–20 kV) current of a few mA. Darsonvalisation was named in honor of French biophysicist Jacques-Arsène d'Arsonval (1851–1940).

Benedikt also took an interest in dowsing (radiesthesia), writing two books on this subject Leitfaden der Rutenlehre (eng. Guideline to use of Divining Rods) and Ruten- und Pendellehre (eng. Instructions in Diving Rods and Pendulums)

== Publications ==
- Moriz Benedikt: Die psychologischen Funktionen des Gehirnes in gesundem und kranker Zustand, Wiener Klinik: Vorträge; Jg. 1, H. 7, Wien, 1875
- Moriz Benedikt: Zur Lehre von der Localisation der Gehirnfunctionen, Wiener Klinik: Vorträge; Jg. 9, H. 5-6, Vienna, 1875
- Moriz Benedikt: Ueber Katalepsie und Mesmerismus, Wiener Klinik: Vorträge; Jg. 6, H. 3/4, Vienna, 1880
- Moriz Benedikt: Ueber Elektricität in der Medicin, Wiener Klinik: Vorträge; Jg. 10, H. 2, Vienna, 1884
- Moriz Benedikt: Grundformeln des neuropathologischen Denkens, Wiener Klinik: Vorträge; Jg. 11, H. 4, Vienna, 1885
- Moriz Benedikt: Hypnotismus und Suggestion, Breitenstein, Leipzig, 1894
- Moriz Benedikt: Seelenkunde des Menschen als reine Erfahrungswissenschaft, Reisland, Leipzig, 1895
- Moriz Benedikt: Krystallisation und Morphogenesis, Perles, Vienna, 1904
- Moriz Benedikt: Aus meinem Leben: Erinnerungen und Erörterungen, Konegen, Vienna, 1906
- Moriz Benedikt: Biomechanik und Biogenesis, Fischer, Jena, 1912
- Moriz Benedikt: Die latenten (Reichenbach'schen) Emanationen der Chemikalien, Konegen, Vienna, 1915
- Moriz Benedikt: Leitfaden der Rutenlehre (Wünschelrute), Urban & Schwarzenberg, Vienna, 1916; modern edition ISBN 978-3956922411
- Moriz Benedikt: Ruten- und Pendellehre, Hartleben, Vienna, 1917

== Sources ==
- Moritz Benedikt’s Localization of Morality in the Occipital Lobes
- Short Biography of Moritz Benedikt
- "Darsonvalisation". Who Named It. Archived from the original on August 2, 2018.
- Moriz Benedikt (1906). Aus meinem Leben. C. Konegen. p. 299. "Aus meinem Leben: Erinnerungen und Erörterungen.", Dr Moritz Benedikt, Verlagsbuchhandlung Carl Konegen, Vienna, 1906.
