= Partial anterior circulation infarct =

- Diagram of the arterial circulation at the base of the brain (inferior view). Anterior circulation represented by top half of diagram (with circle of Willis).
- Specialty: Neurology

Partial anterior circulation infarct (PACI) is a type of cerebral infarction affecting part of the anterior circulation supplying one side of the brain.

Partial anterior circulation stroke syndrome (PACS) refers to the symptoms of a patient who clinically appears to have had a partial anterior circulation infarct, but who has not yet had any diagnostic imaging (e.g. CT Scan) to confirm the diagnosis.

It is diagnosed by any one of the following

- 2 out of 3 features of
  - Higher dysfunction
    - Dysphasia
    - Visuospatial disturbances
  - Homonymous hemianopia
  - Motor and Sensory Defects (>2/3 of face, arm, leg)
- Higher dysfunction alone
- Partial Motor or Sensory Defect

If all of the above symptoms are present, a Total Anterior Circulation Infarct is more likely.

For more information, see stroke.
