= Weber's syndrome =

- Other names: Midbrain stroke syndrome Superior alternating hemiplegia
- Midbrain cross section showing lesion
- Specialty: Neurology
- Treatment: anything which can decrease the stroke's effect

Weber's syndrome, also known as midbrain stroke syndrome or superior alternating hemiplegia, is a form of stroke that affects the medial portion of the midbrain. It involves oculomotor fascicles in the interpeduncular cisterns and cerebral peduncle so it characterizes the presence of an ipsilateral lower motor neuron type oculomotor nerve palsy and contralateral hemiparesis or hemiplegia.

== Cause ==
It is mainly caused by a midbrain infarction as a result of occlusion of a branch of posterior cerebral artery most commonly or the paramedian branches of basilar bifurcation perforating arteries.

This lesion is usually unilateral and affects several structures in the midbrain including:

Structure damaged	Effect
substantia nigra	contralateral parkinsonism because its dopaminergic projections to the basal ganglia innervate the ipsilateral hemisphere motor field, leading to a movement disorder of the contralateral body.
corticospinal fibers	contralateral hemiparesis (if lateral corticospinal tract is only affected) & contralateral hemiplegia (if both lateral & anterior corticospinal tracts are affected) and typical upper motor neuron findings. It is contralateral because it occurs before the decussation in the medulla.
corticobulbar tract	difficulty with contralateral lower facial muscles and hypoglossal nerve functions.
oculomotor nerve fibers	ipsilateral lower motor neuron type oculomotor nerve palsy with a drooping eyelid (partial ptosis) and fixed wide pupil pointed down and out (mydriasis). This leads to diplopia.

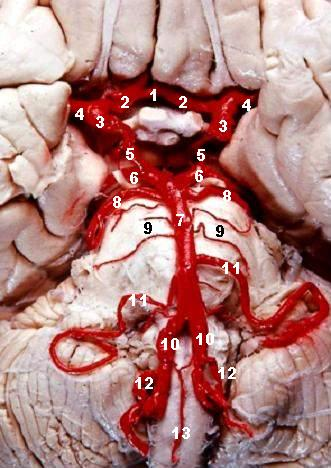
Human brainstem blood supply description. Posterior cerebral artery is #6, and midbrain is behind it.

== Diagnosis ==
Clinical findings mainly eyeball is down and out ipsilateral lateral squint. Ptosis present as the levator palpebrae superioris nerve supply is disrupted. Pupil dilated and fixed. Contralateral hemiplegia CT scan or MRI might help in delineating the cause or the vessel or region of brain involved in stroke.

== History ==
It carries the name of Sir Hermann David Weber, a German-born physician working in London, who described the condition in 1863. It is unrelated to Sturge–Weber syndrome, Klippel–Trénaunay–Weber syndrome or Osler–Weber–Rendu syndrome. These conditions are named for his son Frederick Parkes Weber.

== See also ==
- Alternating hemiplegia of childhood
- Lateral medullary syndrome
- Lateral pontine syndrome
- Medial medullary syndrome
- Medial pontine syndrome
