= Avellis syndrome =

- Specialty: Neurology

Avellis syndrome is a neurological disorder characterized by a peculiar form of alternating paralysis. There is paralysis of the soft palate and vocal cords on one side and loss of pain sensation and temperature sense on the other side, including the extremities, trunk, and neck. It usually results from occlusion of the vertebral artery in lesions of the nucleus ambiguous and pyramidal tract. Horner's syndrome may be associated. In the original description, the vagus and glossopharyngeal nerves were involved; concomitant involvement of the neighbouring cranial nerves was observed later.
