= Posterior cerebral artery syndrome =

Type of reduced brain function due to blood clotting

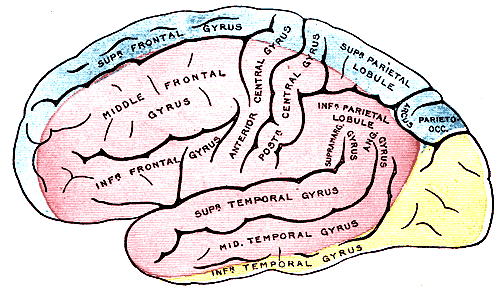
- Outer surface of cerebral hemisphere, showing areas supplied by cerebral arteries. (Yellow is region supplied by posterior cerebral artery.)
- Specialty: Neurology
- Diagnostic method: CT brain to r/o hemorrhagic cause. MRI is gold standard.
- Treatment: Complementary therapies and rehabilitation removal of mechanical interference is also relevant through diagnostic imaging techniques.

Posterior cerebral artery syndrome is a condition whereby the blood supply from the posterior cerebral artery (PCA) is restricted, leading to a reduction of the function of the portions of the brain supplied by that vessel: the occipital lobe, the inferomedial temporal lobe, a large portion of the thalamus, and the upper brainstem and midbrain.

This event restricts the flow of blood to the brain in a near-immediate fashion. The blood hammer is analogous to the water hammer in hydrology, and consists of a sudden increase of the upstream blood pressure in a blood vessel when the bloodstream is abruptly blocked by vessel obstruction. Complete understanding of the relationship between mechanical parameters in vascular occlusions is a critical issue, which can play an important role in the future diagnosis, understanding and treatment of vascular diseases.

Depending upon the location and severity of the occlusion, signs and symptoms may vary within the population affected with PCA syndrome. Blockages of the proximal portion of the vessel produce only minor deficits due to the collateral blood flow from the opposite hemisphere via the posterior communicating artery. In contrast, distal occlusions result in more serious complications. Visual deficits, such as agnosia, prosopagnosia or cortical blindness (with bilateral infarcts) may be a product of ischemic damage to occipital lobe. Occlusions of the branches of the PCA that supply the thalamus can result in central post-stroke pain and lesions to the subthalamic branches can produce “a wide variety of deficits”.

Left posterior cerebral artery syndrome presents alexia without agraphia; the lesion is in the splenium of the corpus callosum.

== Signs and symptoms ==
Peripheral Territory Lesions

1. Contralateral homonymous hemianopsia
2. cortical blindness with bilateral involvement of the occipital lobe branches
3. visual agnosia
4. prosopagnosia
5. dyslexia, Anomic aphasia, color naming and discrimination problems
6. memory defect
7. topographic disorientation

Central Territory Lesions

1. central post-stroke (thalamic) pain: spontaneous pain, dysesthesias and sensory impairments
2. involuntary movements: chorea, intention tremor, hemiballismus
3. contralateral hemiplegia
4. Weber’s syndrome: occulomotor nerve palsy
5. Bálint's syndrome: loss of voluntary eye movements optic ataxia, asimultagnosia (inability to understand visual objects)

== Diagnosis ==
1.CT 2.MRI
