= Flunarizine =

Calcium channel blocker medication

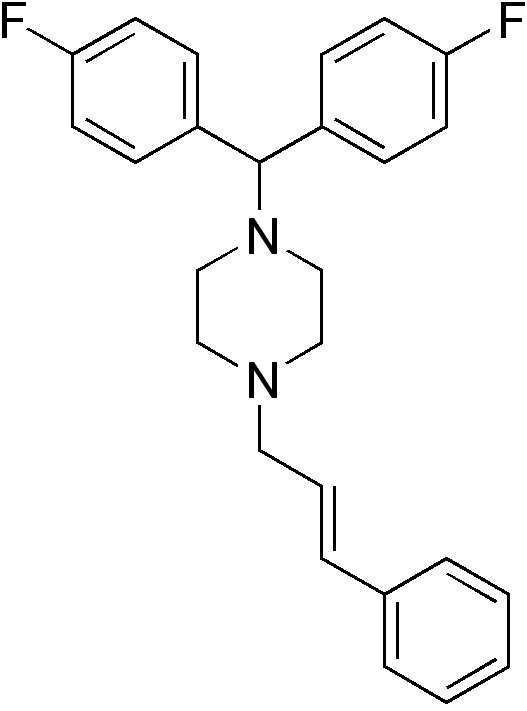

Clinical data
- Trade names: Sibelium, others
- Other names: 1-[bis(4-fluorophenyl)methyl]-4-cinnamyl-piperazine
- AHFS/Drugs.com: Micromedex Detailed Consumer Information
- Pregnancy category: C
- Routes of administration: By mouth
- ATC code: N07CA03 (WHO)

Legal status
- Legal status: In general: ℞ (Prescription only)

Pharmacokinetic data
- Protein binding: >99%
- Metabolism: Mainly CYP2D6
- Metabolites: ≥15
- Elimination half-life: 5–15 hrs (single dose); 18–19 days (multiple doses)
- Excretion: Feces, <1% urine

Identifiers
- IUPAC name: 1-[bis(4-fluorophenyl)methyl]-4-[(2E)-3-phenylprop-2-en-1-yl]piperazine
- CAS Number: 52468-60-7
- PubChem CID: 941361
- DrugBank: DB04841
- ChemSpider: 819216
- UNII: R7PLA2DM0J
- KEGG: D07971
- ChEMBL: ChEMBL30008
- CompTox Dashboard (EPA): DTXSID6045616
- ECHA InfoCard: 100.052.652

Chemical and physical data
- Formula: C_{26}H_{26}F_{2}N_{2}
- Molar mass: 404.505 g·mol^{−1}
- 3D model (JSmol): Interactive image
- Melting point: 251.5 °C (484.7 °F) (dihydrochloride)
- SMILES: Fc1ccc(cc1)C(c2ccc(F)cc2)N3CCN(CC3)C\C=C\c4ccccc4
- InChI: InChI=1S/C26H26F2N2/c27-24-12-8-22(9-13-24)26(23-10-14-25(28)15-11-23)30-19-17-29(18-20-30)16-4-7-21-5-2-1-3-6-21/h1-15,26H,16-20H2/b7-4+; Key:SMANXXCATUTDDT-QPJJXVBHSA-N

Flunarizine, sold under the brand name Sibelium among others, is a drug classified as a calcium antagonist which is used for various indications. It is not available by prescription in the United States or Japan. The drug was discovered at Janssen Pharmaceutica (R14950) in 1968.

== Medical uses ==
Flunarizine is effective in the prophylaxis of migraine, occlusive peripheral vascular disease, vertigo of central and peripheral origin, and as an add-on in the treatment of epilepsy where its effect is weak and not recommended. It has been shown to significantly reduce ocular migraine frequency and severity in both adults and children.

== Contraindications ==
Flunarizine is contraindicated in patients with depression, in the acute phase of a stroke, and in patients with extrapyramidal symptoms or Parkinson's disease.

== Side effects ==
Common side effects include drowsiness (20% of patients), weight gain (10%), as well as extrapyramidal effects and depression in elderly patients.

== Interactions ==
The effects of other sedating drugs and alcohol, as well as antihypertensives, can be increased. No relevant pharmacokinetic interactions have been described.

== Pharmacology ==
=== Mechanism of action ===
Flunarizine is a selective calcium antagonist with moderate other actions including antihistamine, serotonin receptor blocking and dopamine D_{2} blocking activity. Compared to other calcium channel blockers such as dihydropyridine derivatives, verapamil and diltiazem, flunarizine has low affinity to voltage-dependent calcium channels. It has been theorised that it may act not by inhibiting calcium entry into cells, but rather by an intracellular mechanism such as antagonising calmodulin, a calcium binding protein.

=== Pharmacokinetics ===
Flunarizine is well absorbed (>80%) from the gut and reaches maximal blood plasma concentrations after two to four hours, with more than 99% of the substance bound to plasma proteins. It readily passes the blood–brain barrier. When given daily, a steady state is reached after five to eight weeks. Concentrations in the brain are about ten times higher than in the plasma.

It is metabolised in the liver, mainly by the enzyme CYP2D6. At least 15 different metabolites are described, including (in animals) N-desalkyl and hydroxy derivatives and glucuronides. Less than 1% is excreted in unchanged form, and the main excretion path is via bile and faeces. Elimination half life varies widely between individuals and is about 5 to 15 hours after a single dose, and 18 to 19 days on average when given daily.

== Chemistry ==
Flunarizine is a diphenylmethylpiperazine derivative related to the antihistamines hydroxyzine and cinnarizine (an older molecule also discovered by Janssen).

== Research ==
Flunarizine may help to reduce the severity and duration of attacks of paralysis associated with the more serious form of alternating hemiplegia, as well as being effective in rapid onset dystonia-parkinsonism (RDP). Both these conditions arise from specific mutations in the ATP1A3 gene.

Flunarizine extended motor neuron survival in spinal cord, protected skeletal muscles from cell death and atrophy and extended survival by 40% in an animal model of spinal muscular atrophy. Flunarizine has also shown promise as an anti-prion medication.
