= Fulgence Raymond =

French neurologist (1844–1910)

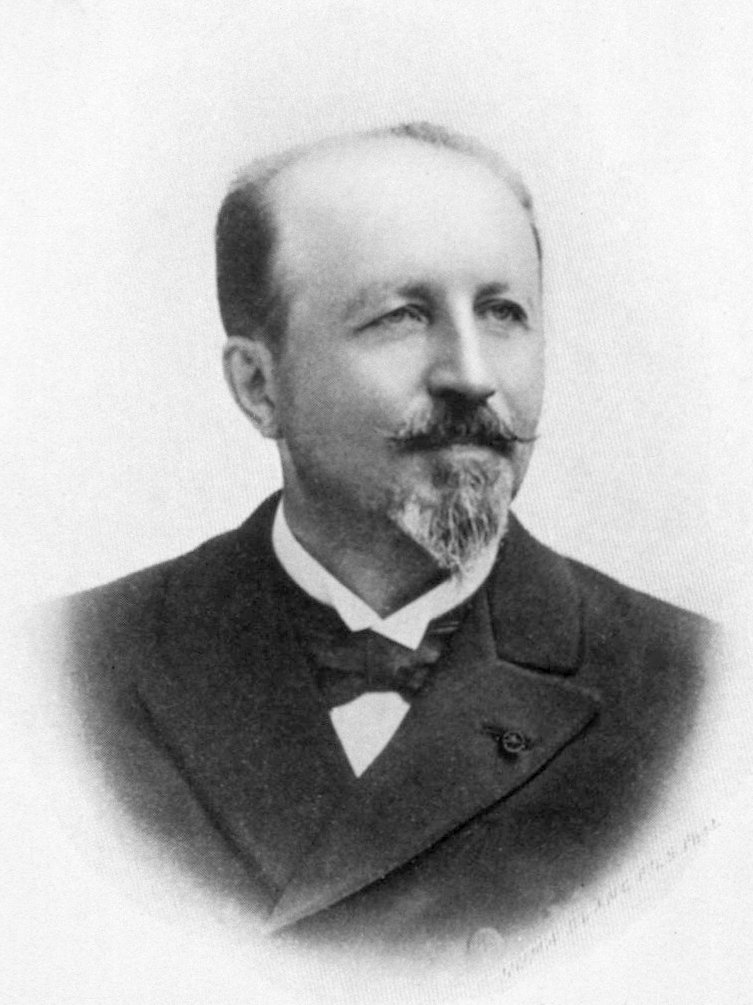
Fulgence Raymond

Fulgence Raymond (29 September 1844 – 28 September 1910) was a French neurologist born in Saint-Christophe-sur-le-Nais, Indre-et-Loire.

Originally trained as a veterinarian, he later studied human medicine under Alfred Vulpian (1826–1887) in Paris. In 1877 he was chef de clinique under Germain Sée (1818–1896), becoming médecin des hôpitaux during the following year, and receiving his habilitation in 1880.

In 1894, he succeeded Jean Martin Charcot (1825–1893) as chair of neurology at the Faculty of Medicine; a position he held until his death in 1910. During his career he worked with several famous physicians, including Joseph Babinski (1857–1932), Georges Marinesco (1863–1938) and Pierre Marie (1853–1940). Radiologist Jean-Athanase Sicard (1872–1929) was a prominent student of his.

Raymond made contributions in research of syringomyelia, neurasthenia, poliomyelitis, tabes dorsalis and diseases of the cauda equina, to name a few. He also investigated hemianesthesia, a condition involving semihemispheric loss of sensitivity due to lesions of the cerebral cortex. With psychologist Pierre Janet (1859–1947) he performed studies on neurosis and psychosomatic disorders. With Janet, he co-wrote "Névroses et idées fixes" and "Les obsessions et la psychasthénie".

== Selected publications ==
- Étude anatomique sur l’hémianesthésie, l’hémichorée et les tremblements symptomatiques, 1876
- Des dyspepsies, 1878
- Anatomie pathologique du système nerveux, 1886
- Étude des maladies du système nerveux en Russie (Report to the ministry), 1888
- Maladies du système nerveux: Atrophies musculaires etc., 1889–1894
- Leçons sur les maladies du système nerveux (six volumes), 1896–1903
- Névroses et idées fixes (with Pierre Janet), 1898
- Les obsessions et la psychasthénie (with Pierre Janet, two volumes), 1903
