= Benedikt syndrome =

- Other names: Paramedian midbrain syndrome
- Specialty: Neurology

Benedikt syndrome, also called Benedikt's syndrome or paramedian midbrain syndrome, is a rare type of posterior circulation stroke of the brain, with a range of neurological symptoms affecting the midbrain, cerebellum and other related structures.

== Presentation ==
Ipsilateral third nerve palsy presenting with ptosis, abduction of eye. Contralateral flapping tremor.

== Causes ==
Benedikt syndrome is caused by a lesion (infarction, hemorrhage, tumor, or tuberculosis) in the tegmentum of the midbrain and cerebellum. Specifically, the median zone is impaired. It can result from occlusion of the posterior cerebral artery or paramedian penetrating branches of the basilar artery.

== Diagnosis ==
- Oculomotor nerve palsy: eyeball gazing downward and outward position, diplopia, mydriasis, ptosis and loss of accommodation reflex.
- Contralateral loss of proprioception and vibration sensations.
- Cerebellar ataxia: involuntary movements.

== Treatment ==
Deep brain stimulation may provide relief from some symptoms of Benedikt syndrome, particularly the tremors associated with the disorder.

== See also ==
- Claude's syndrome
- Wallenberg syndrome
