= Posterior inferior cerebellar artery =

Major artery supplying blood to the cerebellum

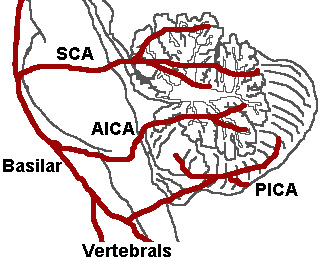
- The three major arteries of the cerebellum: the SCA, AICA, and PICA (posterior inferior cerebellar artery)

- Diagram of the arterial circulation at the base of the brain (inferior view). PICA is labeled at bottom right.

Details
- Source: Vertebral artery
- Branches: Medial branch lateral
- Vein: Inferior cerebellar veins
- Supplies: Cerebellum, choroid plexus of the fourth ventricle

Identifiers
- Latin: arteria inferior posterior cerebelli
- TA98: A12.2.08.012
- TA2: 4542
- FMA: 50518

The posterior inferior cerebellar artery (PICA) is the largest branch of the vertebral artery. It is one of the three main arteries that supply blood to the cerebellum, a part of the brain. Blockage of the posterior inferior cerebellar artery can result in a type of stroke called lateral medullary syndrome.

== Supply ==
The PICA supplies blood to the medulla oblongata; the choroid plexus and tela choroidea of the fourth ventricle; the cerebellar tonsils; the inferior vermis, and the inferior parts of the cerebellum.

=== Course ===
It winds backward around the upper part of the medulla oblongata, passing between the origins of the vagus nerve and the accessory nerve, over the inferior cerebellar peduncle to the undersurface of the cerebellum, where it divides into two branches.

The medial branch continues backward to the notch between the two hemispheres of the cerebellum; while the lateral supplies the under surface of the cerebellum, as far as its lateral border, where it anastomoses with the anterior inferior cerebellar and the superior cerebellar branches of the basilar artery.

Branches from this artery supply the choroid plexus of the fourth ventricle.

== Clinical significance ==
A disrupted blood supply to posterior inferior cerebellar artery due to a thrombus or embolus can result in a stroke and lead to lateral medullary syndrome. Severe occlusion of this artery or to vertebral arteries could lead to Horner's Syndrome as well.
