= Total anterior circulation infarct =

- Specialty: Neurology

Total anterior circulation infarct (TACI) is a type of cerebral infarction affecting the entire anterior circulation supplying one side of the brain. The anterior circulation is the part that is supplied by the internal carotid artery, as opposed to the posterior circulation, supplied by the vertebral arteries.

Total anterior circulation stroke syndrome (TACS) refers to the symptoms of a patient who clinically appears to have had a total anterior circulation infarct, but who has not yet had any diagnostic imaging (e.g. CT Scan) to confirm the diagnosis.

It is diagnosed when it causes all 3 of the following symptoms:

- Higher dysfunction
  - Dysphasia
  - Visuospatial disturbances
  - Decreased level of consciousness
- Homonymous hemianopia
- Motor and Sensory Defects (≥2/3 of face, arm, leg)

For more information, see stroke.
