= Lateral pontine syndrome =

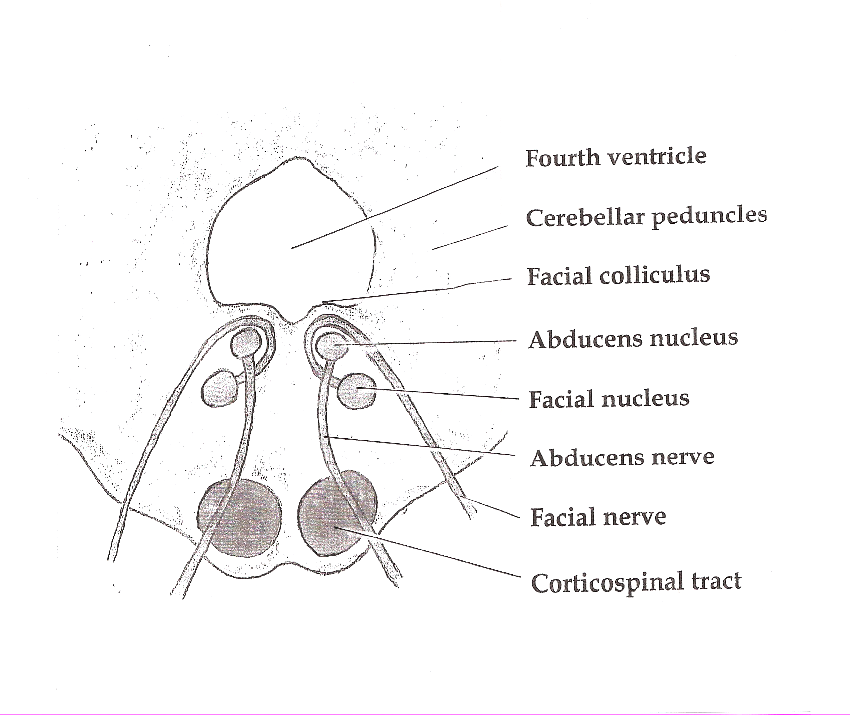
- Pons
- Specialty: Neurology

Lateral pontine syndrome, also known as Marie-Foix syndrome or Marie-Foix-Alajouanine syndrome, is one of the brainstem stroke syndromes of the lateral aspect of the pons. A lateral pontine syndrome is a lesion which is similar to the lateral medullary syndrome, but because it occurs in the pons, it also involves the cranial nerve nuclei of the pons.

== History ==
Lateral pontine syndrome was first described in France by French neurologists Pierre Marie (1853-1940), Charles Foix (1882-1927), and Théophile Alajouanine (1890-1980) in 1922. They were the first to identify and describe the symptoms and causes of this syndrome. In their original description, they reported findings from autopsies that showed spinal cord necrosis and multiple tortuous and thickened blood vessels on the surface of the spinal cord. This condition was later called necrotizing myelopathy.

They emphasized that in their two cases, no thrombosis was present. They considered the vascular component of the entity they reported to be a wall thickening, without luminal narrowing or obliteration of the cord vessels (arteries as well as veins). They addressed, and ruled out, the possibility of vascular malformations.

== Symptoms ==
Damage to the following areas produces symptoms (from medial to lateral):

Structure affected	Effect
Lateral spinothalamic tract	Contralateral loss of pain and temperature from the trunk and extremities.
Facial nucleus & facial Nerve (CN.VII)	(1) Ipsilateral paralysis of the upper and lower face (lower motor neuron lesion). (2) Ipsilateral loss of lacrimation and reduced salivation. (3) Ipsilateral loss of taste from the anterior two-thirds of the tongue. (4) Loss of corneal reflex (efferent limb).
Principal sensory trigeminal nucleus and tract	Ipsilateral loss of all sensory modalities to the face (facial hemianesthesia)
Vestibular Nuclei and intraaxial nerve fibers	Nystagmus, nausea, vomiting, and vertigo
Cochlear nuclei and intraaxial nerve fibers	Hearing loss - ipsilateral central deafness
Middle & inferior cerebellar peduncle	Ipsilateral limb and gait ataxia
Descending sympathetic tract	Ipsilateral Horner's syndrome (ptosis, miosis, & anhydrosis)

== Causes ==
The syndrome occurs due to occlusion of perforating branches of the basilar and anterior inferior cerebellar (AICA) arteries. It can also be caused by an interruption to the blood supply of the anterior inferior cerebellar artery or circumferential arteries.

== Treatment ==
The treatment for lateral pontine syndrome varies greatly, so there are different medications for different symptoms. Sometimes blood thinning agents are prescribed to remove blood flow hindrance. Other than these medications, physical therapy is also necessary
