= Foville's syndrome =

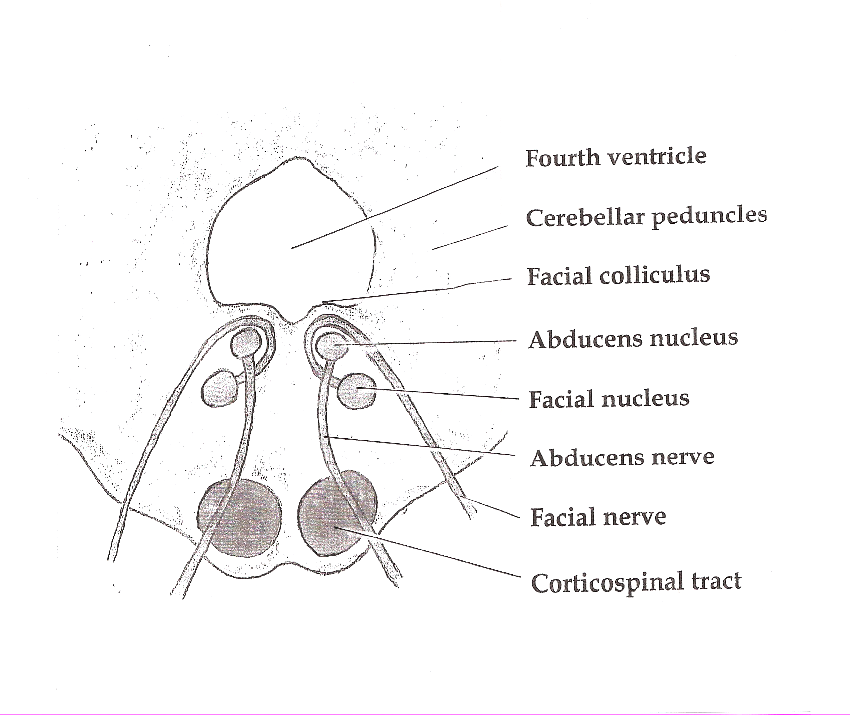
- Pons
- Specialty: Neurology

Foville's syndrome is caused by the blockage of the perforating branches of the basilar artery in the region of the brainstem known as the pons. It is most frequently caused by lesions such as vascular disease and tumors involving the dorsal pons.

Structures affected by the lesion are the dorsal pons (pontine tegmentum) which comprises paramedian pontine reticular formation (PPRF), nuclei of cranial nerves VI and VII, corticospinal tract, medial lemniscus, and the medial longitudinal fasciculus. There is involvement of the fifth to eighth cranial nerves, central sympathetic fibres (Horner syndrome) and horizontal gaze palsy.

== Presentation ==
This produces ipsilateral horizontal gaze palsy and facial nerve palsy and contralateral hemiparesis, hemisensory loss, and internuclear ophthalmoplegia.

Foville syndrome presents like most brainstem strokes, with cranial nerve problems and crossed motor or sensory signs in the limbs. The classic form affects the lower medial pons, damaging cranial nerves VI and VII and the corticospinal tract. Larger lesions can also affect cranial nerves V and VIII, the MLF, and PPRF, causing additional symptoms like ataxia and Horner syndrome.

This syndrome is strongly linked to atherosclerosis and heart disease. Patients often have a history of high blood pressure, high cholesterol, smoking, and diabetes. A history of atrial fibrillation may suggest embolic or bleeding causes.

Physical exam should include complete cardiovascular and neurologic assessments. Vital signs may show high blood pressure or heart rhythm problems. Eye examination may reveal signs of blood vessel disease.

Neurologic findings include:

Cranial nerve signs

- Abducens nerve palsy: Cannot move the affected eye outward; conjugate gaze palsy prevents both eyes from looking toward the affected side
- Facial nerve palsy: Weakness of upper and lower face muscles on the same side
- Hearing loss: From vestibulocochlear nerve damage
- Facial numbness: Loss of touch, pain, and temperature sensation on the same side

Long-tract signs

- Hemiplegia: Weakness on the opposite side of the body
- Sensory loss: Loss of fine touch, vibration, and position sense on the opposite side
- Horner syndrome: Droopy eyelid, small pupil, and decreased sweating on the same side
- Ataxia: Poor coordination on the same side due to cerebellar pathway damage

== History ==
Foville's syndrome was initially described by Achille-Louis Foville, a French physician, in 1859.
