= Alternating hemiplegia of childhood =

- Other names: AHC
- Specialty: Neurology

Alternating hemiplegia of childhood (AHC) is a rare neurological disorder named for the transient episodes, often referred to as "attacks", of hemiplegia (weakness or paralysis) that those with the condition experience. It typically presents before the age of 18 months. These hemiplegic attacks can cause anything from mild weakness to complete paralysis on one or both sides of the body, and they can vary greatly in duration. Attacks may also alternate from one side of the body to the other, or alternate between affecting one or both sides during a single attack. Besides hemiplegia, symptoms of the disorder include an extremely broad range of neurological and developmental impairments which are not well understood. Normally, hemiplegia and other associated symptoms cease completely with sleep, but they may recur upon waking.

Most frequently AHC is caused by a spontaneous mutation in the ATP1A3 gene. It is an extremely rare disorder – approximately one in one million people have AHC. It was only recently discovered, having first been characterized in 1971.

== Signs and symptoms ==
AHC patients exhibit a wide range of symptoms in addition to hemiplegic attacks. These can be further characterized as paroxysmal and non-paroxysmal symptoms. Paroxysmal symptoms are generally associated with hemiplegic attacks and may occur suddenly with hemiplegia or on their own. Paroxysmal symptoms may last for variable amounts of time. Non-paroxysmal symptoms tend to be side effects of AHC which are present at all times, not just during episodes or attacks. Epilepsy, which is also considered a paroxysmal symptom, plays an important role in the progression and diagnosis of AHC.

=== Hemiplegic attacks ===
Chronologically, hemiplegic attacks are not always the first symptom of AHC, but they are the most prominent symptom, as well as the symptom for which the disorder is named. Hemiplegic attacks may affect one or both sides of the body, and attacks which affect both sides of the body may be referred to as either bilateral or quadriplegic attacks. One of the unique characteristics of AHC is that hemiplegic attacks, as well as other symptoms which may co-occur with hemiplegia, cease immediately upon sleep. During strong attacks, the symptoms may reoccur upon waking. Hemiplegic attacks can occur suddenly or gradually, and the severity of an attack can vary over its duration. The attacks may alternate from one side of the body to another, though this is rare. The length of attacks may also vary from minutes to weeks, though the length of attacks varies more greatly between people than between attacks for one person. Both bilateral and hemiplegic attacks are associated with pseudobulbar features such as dysphagia, dysarthria, and respiratory difficulty. Paralysis is also often accompanied by changes in skin color and temperature, sweating, restlessness, tremor, screaming, and the appearance of pain. Hemiplegic attacks happen irregularly and can occur with speech, eating, and swallowing impairment. Patients with AHC are frequently underweight due to these side effects. The average age of onset for hemiplegic episodes has been found to be 6–7 months of age. This early onset gives the name of this disorder the slightly misleading ending "of childhood". AHC is not exclusively limited to childhood – attacks in some cases become milder after the first ten years of life, but they never completely disappear.

=== Paroxysmal symptoms ===
AHC patients have exhibited various paroxysmal symptoms which manifest to different degrees in each person. Paroxysmal symptoms include tonic, tonic–clonic, or myoclonic limb movements, dystonic posturing, choreoathetosis, ocular nystagmus, and various other ocular motor abnormalities. Almost half of all people have dystonic symptoms prior to experiencing hemiplegia. These symptoms generally begin before 8 months of age. Ocular motor abnormalities occur early, and these are the most frequent early symptoms of AHC, particularly nystagmus. Almost 1/3 of people with this disorder had episodic ocular motor features within 1–2 days of birth. Many also experienced hemiplegia and dystonia before 3 months of age. A final symptom that may be considered paroxysmal is a temporary change in behavior - some patients will become unreasonable, demanding, and aggressive either before or after an attack.

Not all patients have all of these symptoms, and it is not known whether they are caused by AHC. Symptoms usually manifest in the first 3 months of the child's life, with an average onset of 2.5 months. Frequently, some of these symptoms will manifest in the neonatal period. These paroxysmal symptoms are often used to help diagnose AHC, since there is no simple test for it.

In some cases, EEGs taken during these paroxysmal events were characterized by a generalized background slowing. Overall however, EEG during episodes and other investigative methods such as brain MRI, TACs, angiographic MRIs and CFS have normal results.

=== Non-paroxysmal symptoms ===
In the long term, many paroxysmal symptoms occur along with AHC, and while these symptoms vary in strength depending on the person, they are consistent features of AHC. It is thought that some of these symptoms are brought on or worsened by hemiplegic attacks, though it is not known for certain. Patients experience persistent motor, movement (ataxia), and cognitive deficits. These deficits become more apparent over time and include developmental delays, social problems, and retardation. It is rare for someone with AHC not to have cognitive deficits, but a study in Japan did find two patients who met all of the diagnostic criteria for AHC but who were not mentally impaired. It is not known whether AHC is a progressive disease, but severe attacks are suspected to cause damage which results in permanent loss of function. 100% of children studied in the USA have had some form of mental impairment, which is usually described as mild to moderate, but varies greatly among individuals.

=== Epilepsy ===
At least 50% of people with AHC also have epilepsy, and AHC is often misdiagnosed as epilepsy because of this. These epileptic events are distinguished from other episodes by an alteration of consciousness, as well as frequent tonic or tonic–clonic activity. Epileptic episodes are generally rare, though they do increase with age. Due to the rarity of epileptic episodes, there are few EEG confirmations of them.

== Cause ==
Recent research suggests that AHC is caused by a de novo (spontaneous) genetic mutation in the ATP1A3 gene on chromosome 19 (locus 19q13.31) which encodes enzyme ATP1A3. A small number of cases seem to be caused by a mutation in the ATP1A2 gene. Where the mutation is inherited, it has the autosomal dominant pattern of inheritance.

Previously AHC was thought to be a form of complicated migraine because of strong family histories of migraine reported in AHC cases. AHC has also been considered to be a movement disorder or a form of epilepsy. Suggested causes have included channelopathy, mitochondrial dysfunction, and cerebrovascular dysfunction. The disorder most closely related to AHC is familial hemiplegic migraine which is caused by a mutation in a gene for calcium channel receptors. It was thus thought that AHC may be caused by a similar channelopathy.

== Diagnosis ==
As of 1993 only approximately 30 people with AHC had been described in scientific literature. Due to the rarity and complexity of AHC, it is not unusual for the initial diagnosis to be incorrect, or for diagnosis to be delayed for several months after the initial symptoms become apparent. The average age of diagnosis is just over 36 months. Diagnosis of AHC is not only difficult because of its rarity, but because there is no diagnostic test, making this a diagnosis of exclusion. There are several generally accepted criteria which define this disorder, however other conditions with a similar presentation, such as HSV encephalitis, must first be ruled out. Due to these diagnostic difficulties, it is possible that the commonness of the disease is underestimated.

The following descriptions are commonly used in the diagnosis of AHC. The initial four criteria for classifying AHC were that it begins before 18 months of age, includes attacks of both hemiplegia on either side of the body, as well as other autonomic problems such as involuntary eye movement (episodic monocular nystagmus), improper eye alignment, choreoathetosis, and sustained muscle contractions (dystonia). Finally, those with the condition often develop intellectual disabilities, delayed development, and other neurological conditions. These diagnostic criteria were updated in 1993 to include the fact that all of these symptoms dissipate immediately upon sleeping. Diagnostic criteria were also expanded to include episodes of bilateral hemiplegia which shifted from one side of the body to the other.

Recent criteria have been proposed for screening for AHC early, in order to improve the diagnostic timeline. These screening criteria include focal or unilateral paroxysmal dystonia in the first 6 months of life, as well as the possibility of flaccid hemiplegia either with or separate from these symptoms. Paroxysmal ocular movements should also be considered, and these should include both binocular and monocular symptoms which show in the first 3 months of life.

== Treatments ==
Overall outcomes for AHC are generally poor, which is contributed to by AHC's various diagnostic and management challenges. In the long term, AHC is debilitating due to both the hemiplegic attacks and permanent damage associated with AHC. This damage can include cognitive impairment, behavioral and psychiatric disorders, and various motor impairments. There is, however, not yet any conclusive evidence that AHC is fatal or that it shortens life expectancy, but the relatively recent discovery of the disorder makes large data for this type of information unavailable. Treatment for AHC has not been extremely successful, and there is no cure. There are several drugs available for treatment, as well as management strategies for preventing and dealing with hemiplegic attacks.

=== Management strategies ===
Hemiplegic attacks can be brought on by particular triggers, and management of AHC often centers around avoiding common or known triggers. While triggers vary greatly from person to person, there are also some common ones which are prevalent in many patients. Common triggers include temperature changes, water exposure, bright lights, certain foods, emotional stress, and physical activity. While avoiding triggers may help, it cannot prevent all hemiplegic episodes because many occur without being triggered. Because attacks and other associated symptoms end with sleep, various sedatives can be used to help patients sleep.

=== Flunarizine ===
The most common drug used to treat AHC is flunarizine. Flunarizine functions by acting as a calcium channel blocker. Other drugs, in order of frequency of use are benzodiazepines, carbamazapine, barbiturates, and valproic acid. Flunarizine is prescribed for the purpose of reducing the severity of AHC attacks and the number of episodes, though it rarely stops attacks altogether. Minimizing the attacks may help reduce damage to the body from hemiplegic attacks and improve long-term outcomes as far as mental and physical disabilities are concerned.

Experts differ in their confidence in flunarizine's effectiveness. Some studies have found it to be very effective in reducing the duration, severity, and frequency of hemiplegic attacks. It is generally considered the best treatment available, but this drug is thought by some to be of little benefit to AHC patients. Many affected people experience adverse effects without seeing any improvement. Flunarizine also causes problems because it is difficult for patients to obtain, as it is not readily available in the United States.

=== Sodium oxybate ===
In 2009 through 2011 clinical research at the University of Utah investigated whether sodium oxybate, also known as gamma-hydroxybutyric acid, is an effective treatment for AHC. Thus far, only a small number of patients have been sampled, and no conclusive results are yet available. While some success has been had thus far with the drug, AHC patients have been known to respond well initially to other drugs, but then the effectiveness will decline over time. Currently, sodium oxybate is used as a narcolepsy-cataplexy treatment, though in the past it has been used controversially in nutritional supplements. This drug was chosen to test because of a possible link between the causes of narcolepsy-cataplexy and AHC.
