= Cerebral circulation =

Brain blood supply

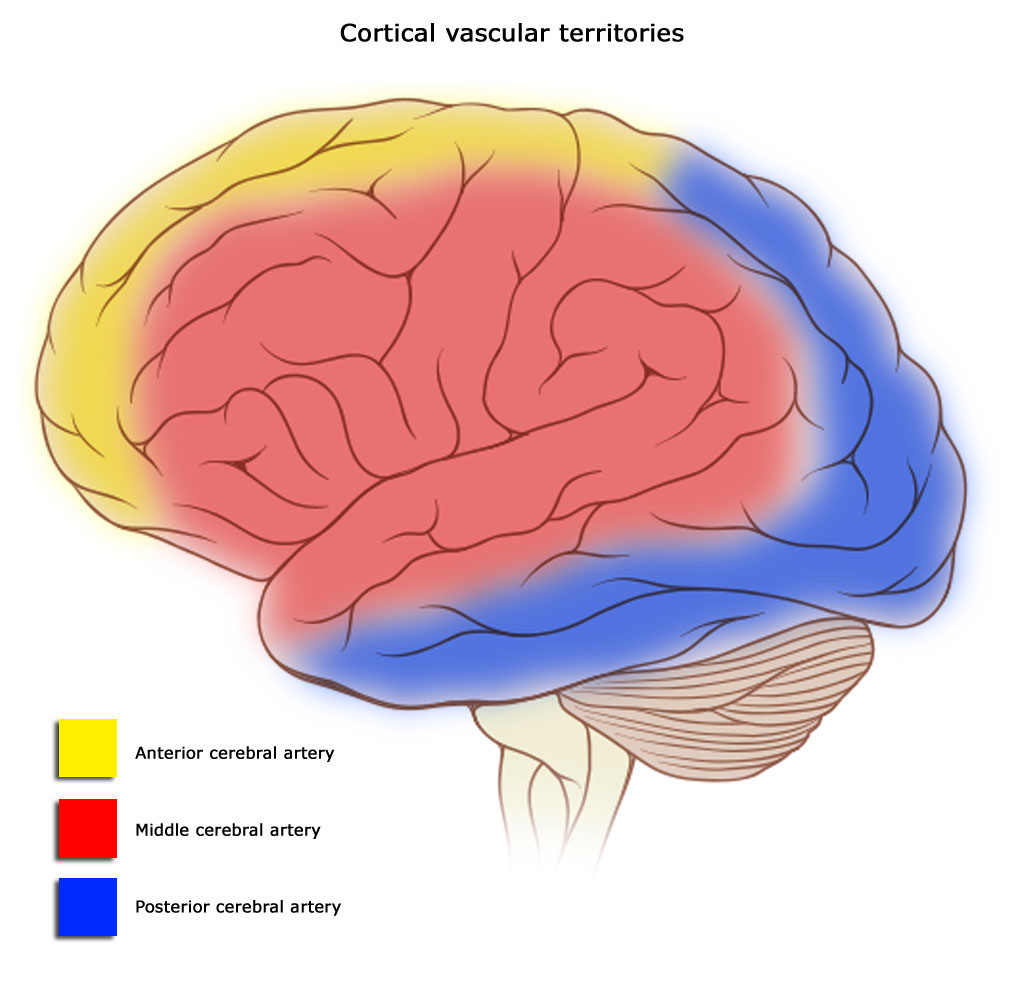
- Areas of the brain are supplied by different arteries. The major systems are divided into an anterior circulation (the anterior cerebral artery and middle cerebral artery) and a posterior circulation.

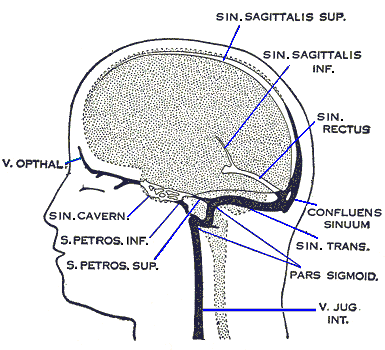
- Schematic of veins and venous spaces that drain deoxygenated blood from the brain

Identifiers
- MeSH: D002560

Cerebral circulation is the movement of blood through a network of cerebral arteries and veins supplying the brain. The rate of cerebral blood flow in an adult human is typically 750 milliliters per minute, or about 15% of cardiac output. Arteries deliver oxygenated blood, glucose and other nutrients to the brain. Veins carry "used or spent" blood back to the heart, to remove carbon dioxide, lactic acid, and other metabolic products. The neurovascular unit regulates cerebral blood flow so that activated neurons can be supplied with energy in the right amount and at the right time. Because the brain would quickly suffer damage from any stoppage in blood supply, the cerebral circulatory system has safeguards including autoregulation of the blood vessels. The failure of these safeguards may result in a stroke. The volume of blood in circulation is called the cerebral blood flow. Sudden intense accelerations change the gravitational forces perceived by bodies and can severely impair cerebral circulation and normal functions to the point of becoming serious life-threatening conditions.

The following description is based on idealized human cerebral circulation. The pattern of circulation and its nomenclature vary between organisms.

== Anatomy ==
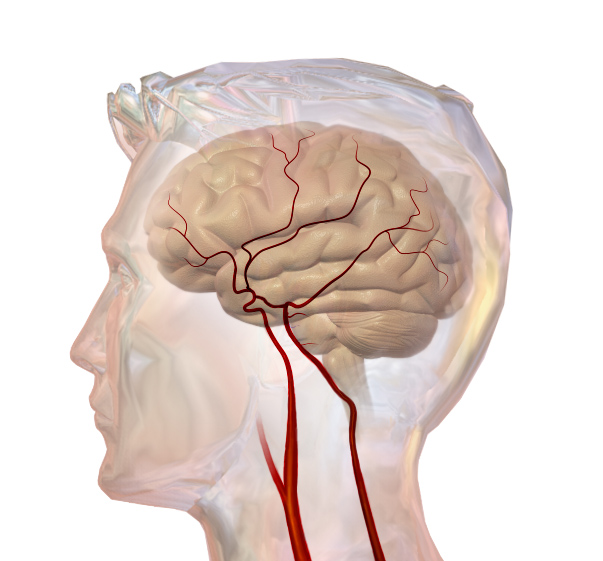
Cerebrovascular system

=== Blood supply ===
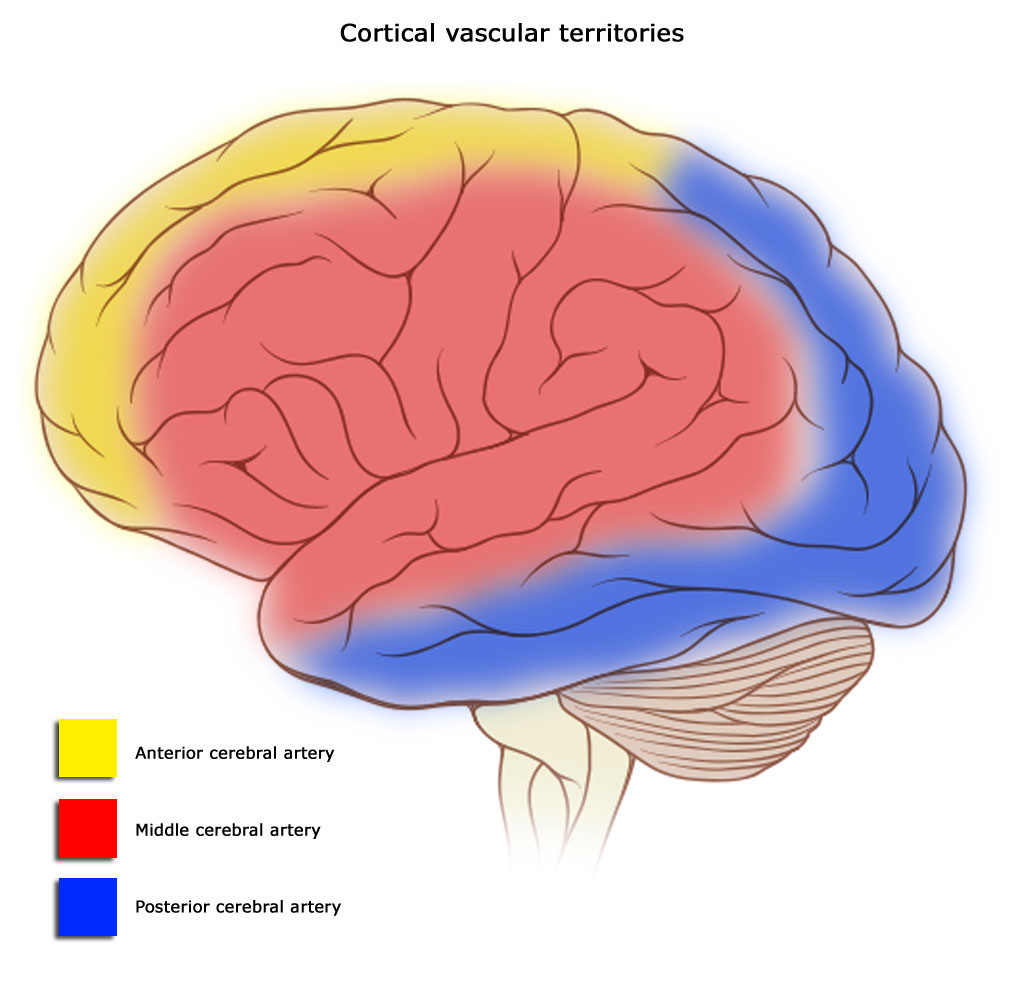
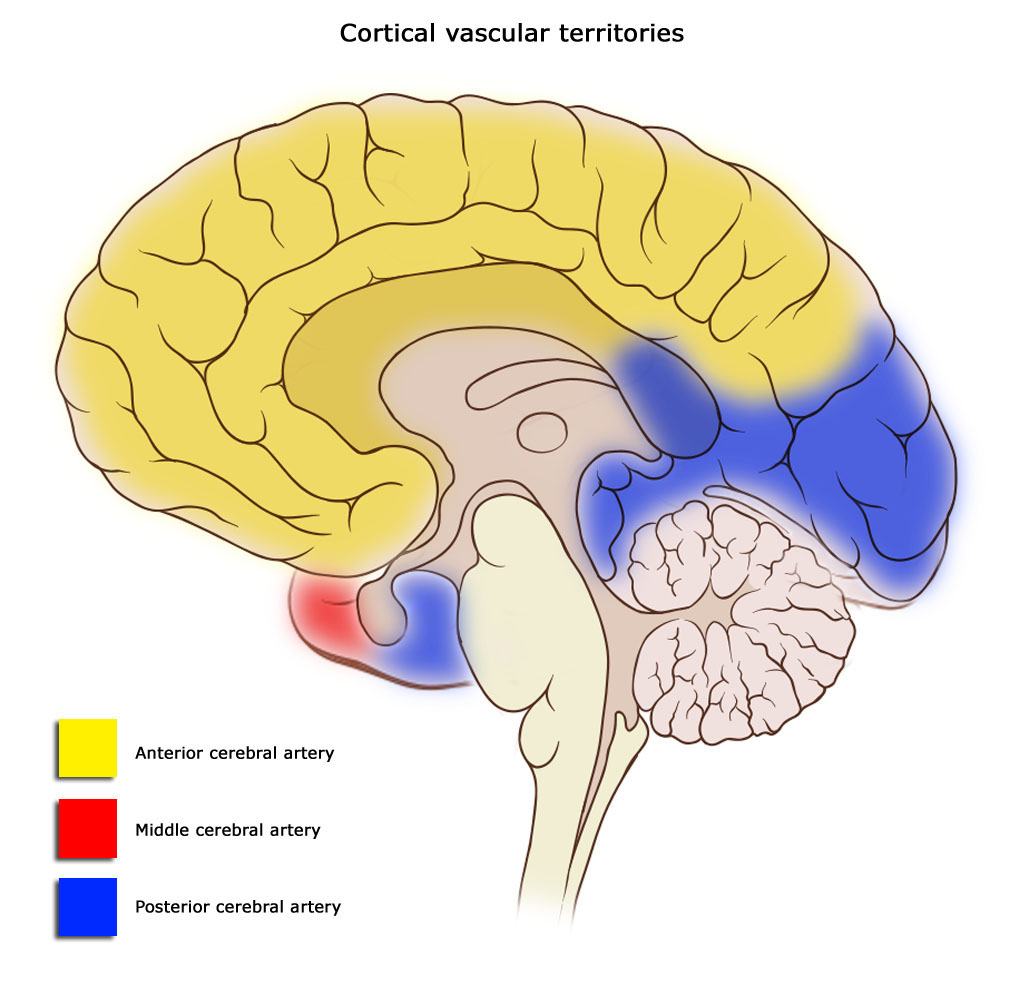
Cortical areas and their arterial blood supply

Blood supply to the brain is normally divided into anterior and posterior segments, relating to the different arteries that supply the brain. The two main pairs of arteries are the internal carotid arteries (supply the anterior brain) and vertebral arteries (supplying the brainstem and posterior brain). The anterior and posterior cerebral circulations are interconnected via bilateral posterior communicating arteries. They are part of the circle of Willis, which provides backup circulation to the brain. In case one of the supply arteries is occluded, the circle of Willis provides interconnections between the anterior and the posterior cerebral circulation along the floor of the cerebral vault, providing blood to tissues that would otherwise become ischemic.

==== Anterior cerebral circulation ====
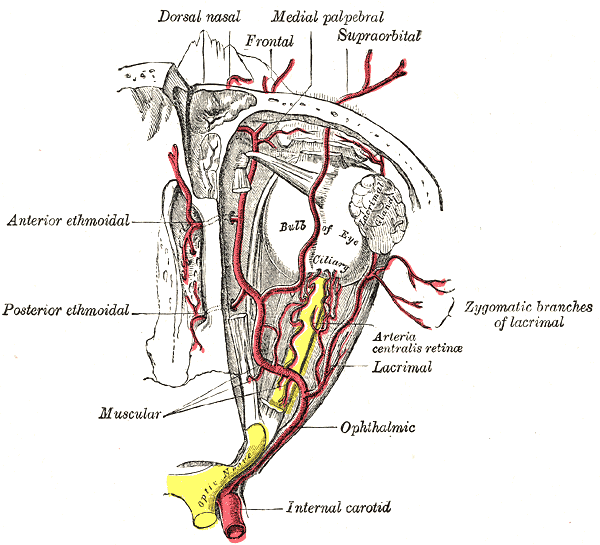
The ophthalmic artery and its branches

The anterior cerebral circulation is the blood supply to the anterior portion of the brain including eyes. It is supplied by the following arteries:

- Internal carotid arteries: These large arteries are the medial branches of the common carotid arteries which enter the skull, as opposed to the external carotid branches which supply the facial tissues; the internal carotid artery branches into the anterior cerebral artery and continues to form the middle cerebral artery.
- Anterior cerebral artery (ACA)
  - Anterior communicating artery: Connects both anterior cerebral arteries, within and along the floor of the cerebral vault.
- Middle cerebral artery (MCA)

==== Posterior cerebral circulation ====
The anterior and posterior circulations meet at the circle of Willis, pictured here, which rests at the top of the brainstem. Inferior view.

The posterior cerebral circulation is the blood supply to the posterior portion of the brain, including the occipital lobes, cerebellum and brainstem. It is supplied by the following arteries:

- Vertebral arteries: These smaller arteries branch from the subclavian arteries which primarily supply the shoulders, lateral chest, and arms. Within the cranium the two vertebral arteries fuse into the basilar artery.
  - Posterior inferior cerebellar artery (PICA)
- Basilar artery: Supplies the midbrain, cerebellum, and usually branches into the posterior cerebral artery
  - Anterior inferior cerebellar artery (AICA)
  - Pontine branches
  - Superior cerebellar artery (SCA)
- Posterior cerebral artery (PCA)
- Posterior communicating artery

=== Venous drainage ===
The venous drainage of the cerebrum can be separated into two subdivisions: superficial and deep.

The superficial system

The superficial system is composed of dural venous sinuses, sinuses (channels) within the dura mater. The dural sinuses are therefore located on the surface of the cerebrum. The most prominent of these sinuses is the superior sagittal sinus which is located in the sagittal plane under the midline of the cerebral vault, posteriorly and inferiorly to the confluence of sinuses, where the superficial drainage joins with the sinus that primarily drains the deep venous system. From here, two transverse sinuses bifurcate and travel laterally and inferiorly in an S-shaped curve that forms the sigmoid sinuses which go on to form the two jugular veins. In the neck, the jugular veins parallel the upward course of the carotid arteries and drain blood into the superior vena cava. The veins puncture the relevant dural sinus, piercing the arachnoid and dura mater as bridging veins that drain their contents into the sinus.

The deep venous system

The deep venous system is primarily composed of traditional veins inside the deep structures of the brain, which join behind the midbrain to form the great cerebral vein (vein of Galen). This vein merges with the inferior sagittal sinus to form the straight sinus which then joins the superficial venous system mentioned above at the confluence of sinuses.

== Maturation of cerebral blood vessels ==
The maturation of blood vessels in the brain is a critical process that occurs postnatally. It involves the acquisition of key barrier and contractile properties essential for brain function. During the early postnatal phase, endothelial cells (ECs) and vascular smooth muscle cells (VSMCs) undergo significant molecular and functional changes.

Endothelial cells begin to express P-glycoprotein, a crucial efflux transporter that helps protect the brain by expelling harmful substances. This efflux capacity is progressively acquired and becomes fully functional by the postnatal period. Additionally, VSMCs, which initially populate the arterial network, start to express contractile proteins such as smooth muscle actin (SMA) and myosin-11, transforming VSMCs into contractile cells capable of regulating blood vessel tone and cerebral blood flow.

The expression of Myh11 in VSMCs acts as a developmental switch, with significant upregulation occurring from birth to the age of 2 to 5 years. This is a critical period needed for the establishment of vessel contractility and the overall functionality of the cerebral circulation.

== Physiology ==
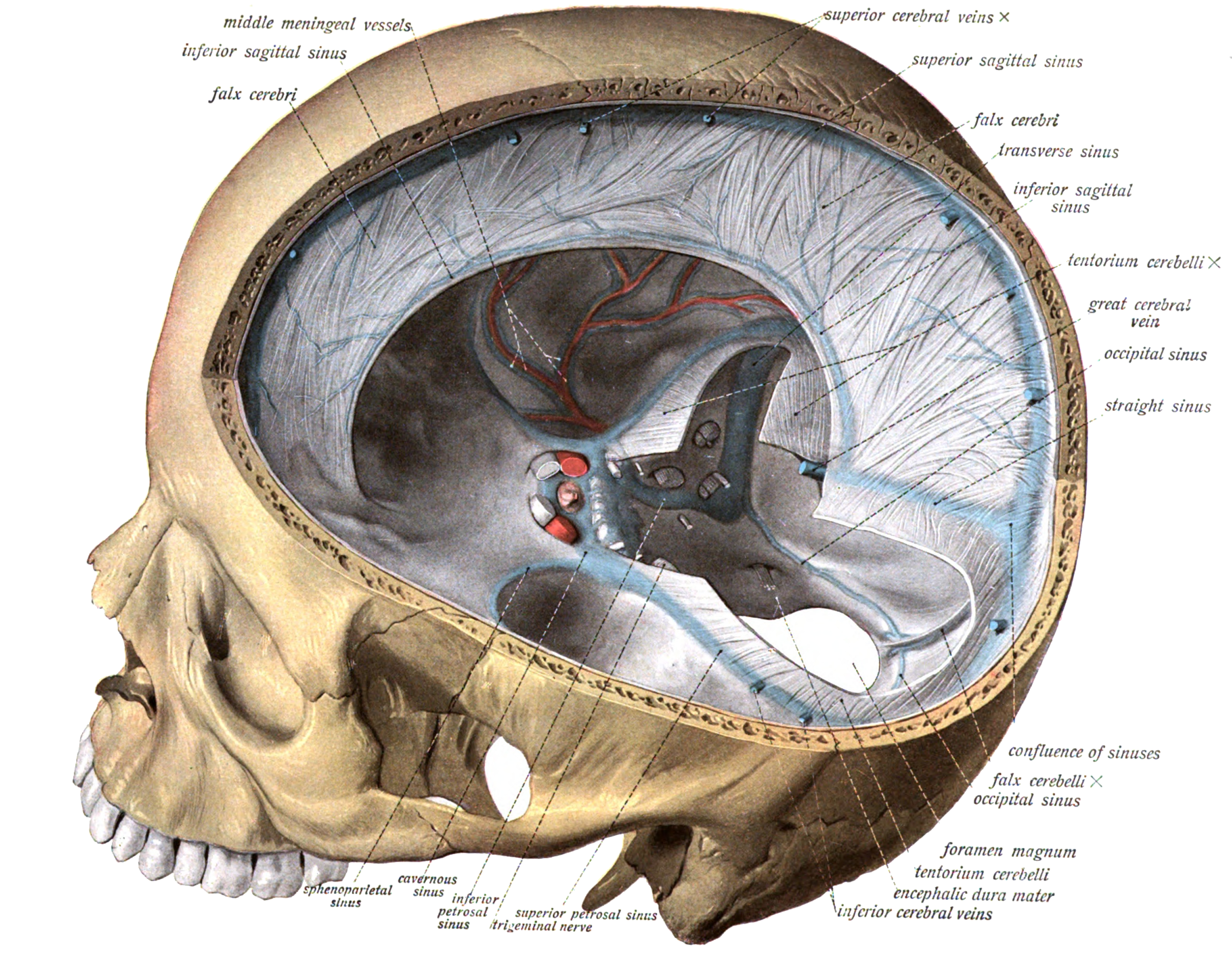
Dural venous sinuses bordered by hard meninges (shown in blue) direct blood outflow from cerebral veins to the internal jugular vein at the base of skull.

Cerebral blood flow (CBF) is the blood supply to the brain in a given period of time. In an adult, CBF is typically 750 millilitres per minute or 15.8 ± 5.7% of the cardiac output. This equates to an average perfusion of 50 to 54 millilitres of blood per 100 grams of brain tissue per minute.

The ratio index of cerebral blood flow/cardiac output (CCRI) decreases by 1.3% per decade, even though cardiac output remains unchanged. Across the adult lifespan, women have a higher CCRI than men. CBF is inversely associated with body mass index.

CBF is tightly regulated to meet the brain's metabolic demands. Too much blood (a clinical condition of a normal homeostatic response of hyperemia) can raise intracranial pressure (ICP), which can compress and damage delicate brain tissue. Too little blood flow (ischemia) results if blood flow to the brain is below 18 to 20 ml per 100 g per minute, and tissue death occurs if flow dips below 8 to 10 ml per 100 g per minute. In brain tissue, a biochemical cascade known as the ischemic cascade is triggered when the tissue becomes ischemic, potentially resulting in damage to and the death of brain cells. Medical professionals must take steps to maintain proper CBF in patients who have conditions like shock, stroke, cerebral edema, and traumatic brain injury.

Cerebral blood flow is determined by a number of factors, such as viscosity of blood, how dilated blood vessels are, and the net pressure of the flow of blood into the brain, known as cerebral perfusion pressure, which is determined by the body's blood pressure. Cerebral perfusion pressure (CPP) is defined as the mean arterial pressure (MAP) minus the intracranial pressure (ICP). In normal individuals, it should be above 50 mm Hg. Intracranial pressure should not be above 15 mm Hg (ICP of 20 mm Hg is considered as intracranial hypertension). Cerebral blood vessels are able to change the flow of blood through them by altering their diameters in a process called cerebral autoregulation; they constrict when systemic blood pressure is raised and dilate when it is lowered. Arterioles also constrict and dilate in response to different chemical concentrations. For example, they dilate in response to higher levels of carbon dioxide in the blood and constrict in response to lower levels of carbon dioxide.

For example, assuming a person with an arterial partial pressure of carbon dioxide (PaCO2) of 40 mmHg (normal range of 38–42 mmHg) and a CBF of 50 ml per 100g per min. If the PaCO2 dips to 30 mmHg, this represents a 10 mmHg decrease from the initial value of PaCO2. Consequently, the CBF decreases by 1ml per 100g per min for each 1mmHg decrease in PaCO2, resulting in a new CBF of 40ml per 100g of brain tissue per minute. In fact, for each 1 mmHg increase or decrease in PaCO2, between the range of 20–60 mmHg, there is a corresponding CBF change in the same direction of approximately 1–2 ml/100g/min, or 2–5% of the CBF value. This is why small alterations in respiration pattern can cause significant changes in global CBF, specially through PaCO2 variations.

CBF is equal to the cerebral perfusion pressure (CPP) divided by the cerebrovascular resistance (CVR):

CBF = CPP / CVR

Control of CBF is considered in terms of the factors affecting CPP and the factors affecting CVR. CVR is controlled by four major mechanisms:

1. Metabolic control (or 'metabolic autoregulation')
2. Pressure autoregulation
3. Chemical control (by arterial pCO_{2} and pO_{2})
4. Neural control

=== Role of intracranial pressure ===
Increased intracranial pressure (ICP) causes decreased blood perfusion of brain cells by mainly two mechanisms:

- Increased ICP constitutes an increased interstitial hydrostatic pressure that, in turn, causes a decreased driving force for capillary filtration from intracerebral blood vessels.
- Increased ICP compresses cerebral arteries, causing increased cerebrovascular resistance (CVR).

=== Cerebral perfusion pressure ===
Cerebral perfusion pressure is the net pressure gradient causing cerebral blood flow to the brain (brain perfusion). It must be maintained within narrow limits; too little pressure could cause brain tissue to become ischemic (having inadequate blood flow), and too much could raise intracranial pressure.

=== Imaging ===
Arterial spin labeling (ASL), phase contrast magnetic resonance imaging (PC-MRI), and positron emission tomography (PET) are neuroimaging techniques that can be used to measure CBF. ASL and PET can also be used to measure regional CBF (rCBF) within a specific brain region. rCBF at one location can be measured over time by thermal diffusion
