= CED =

CED may refer to:

- CED, a magazine published by Advantage Business Marketing (bankrupt 2019)
- Canadian Eskimo Dog
- Camurati–Engelmann disease, a rare genetic syndrome
- Capacitance Electronic Disc, a playback-only video medium
- Ceduna Airport, IATA airport code "CED"
- Cheddington railway station, a British railway station with station code CED
- Classical electromagnetism, a.k.a. classical electrodynamics
- Collective Earth Defense, a fictional organisation in the video game Descent 3
- UC Berkeley College of Environmental Design
- Collins English Dictionary
- Committee for Economic Development
- Community economic development
- Convection enhanced delivery, an experimental drug delivery method
- Course and Exam Description, a requirement for US and Canadian highschool courses to qualify for the Advanced Placement program
- Cross elasticity of demand, in economics
- CygnusEd, text editor software
- Déviation conjuguée, a.k.a. conjugate eye deviation
