= Anterior cerebral artery syndrome =

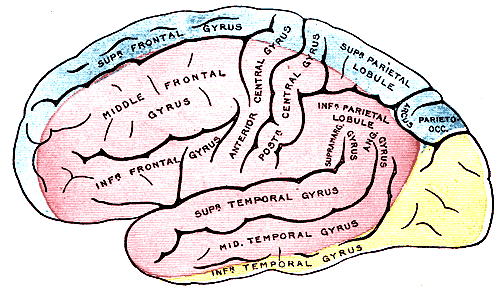
- Outer surface of cerebral hemisphere, showing areas supplied by cerebral arteries. (Blue is region supplied by anterior cerebral artery.)
- Specialty: Neurology

Anterior cerebral artery syndrome is a condition whereby the blood supply from the anterior cerebral artery (ACA) is restricted, leading to a reduction of the function of the portions of the brain supplied by that vessel: the medial aspects of the frontal and parietal lobes, basal ganglia, anterior fornix and anterior corpus callosum.

Depending upon the area and severity of the occlusion, signs and symptoms may vary within the population affected with ACA syndrome. Blockages to the proximal (A1) segment of the vessel produce only minor deficits due to the collateral blood flow from the opposite hemisphere via the anterior communicating artery. Occlusions distal to this segment will result in more severe presentation of ACA syndrome. Contralateral hemiparesis and hemisensory loss of the lower extremity is the most common symptom associated with ACA syndrome.

== Signs and symptoms ==
1. Hemiparesis or hemiplegia contralaterally, involving primarily the lower limbs and pelvic floor musculature
2. Sensory deficits contralaterally, involving primarily the leg and perineum
3. Apraxia (due to branches to the supplementary motor area and corpus callosum)
4. Disconnection syndrome (due to callosal branches)
5. Anosmia (due to branches of the olfactory bulb and olfactory tract)
6. Urinary incontinence
7. Grasp reflex and or sucking reflex contralaterally (if circle of Willis compromised)

== Causes ==
Smoking, diabetes mellitus, high blood pressure, high cholesterol, and cardiovascular disease are recognized risk factors that are commonly present in stroke patients. An additional important risk factor is atrial fibrillation.

An ischemic stroke's main cause is atherosclerosis. Stroke is commonly caused by atherosclerotic large vessel disease and results from local branch occlusion by plaque, artery-to-artery embolism, or in situ thrombosis, with the latter being the most common cause of anterior cerebral artery infarction. The most commonly reported etiology in studies involving patients with Asian ancestry is atherosclerosis.

Additional important causes of anterior cerebral artery infarction include cardiac embolism from various sources, such as tumors, intracardiac thrombus, atrial fibrillation, and valve disease. Arterial dissection is a significant additional mechanism of anterior cerebral artery stroke.

Some less common mechanisms, such as coagulopathic states and vasculitis, have been described. Another cause is vasospasm. Pituitary apoplexy and subarachnoid hemorrhage have been identified as triggers.

== Diagnosis ==
When an acute ischemic stroke is suspected, routine assessments of the airway, breathing, and circulation are made; blood glucose is checked; a validated stroke severity scale assessment is conducted; and an accurate, focused history is obtained with respect to the time of symptom onset, last known well, or baseline.

To determine the type and characteristics of a stroke, brain imaging is an essential part of the stroke patient evaluation process. The preferred imaging modality in this case is non-contrast computed tomography (CT) of the head. Depending on where they are or how big they are, anterior cerebral artery strokes may be overlooked on imaging tests. Quick noncontrast head CT should be followed by head and neck CT angiography in order to identify intracranial large vessel occlusion as soon as possible.

== Epidemiology ==
Anterior cerebral artery syndrome accounts for 0.3% to 4.4% of stroke cases.
