= Leptomeningeal collateral circulation =

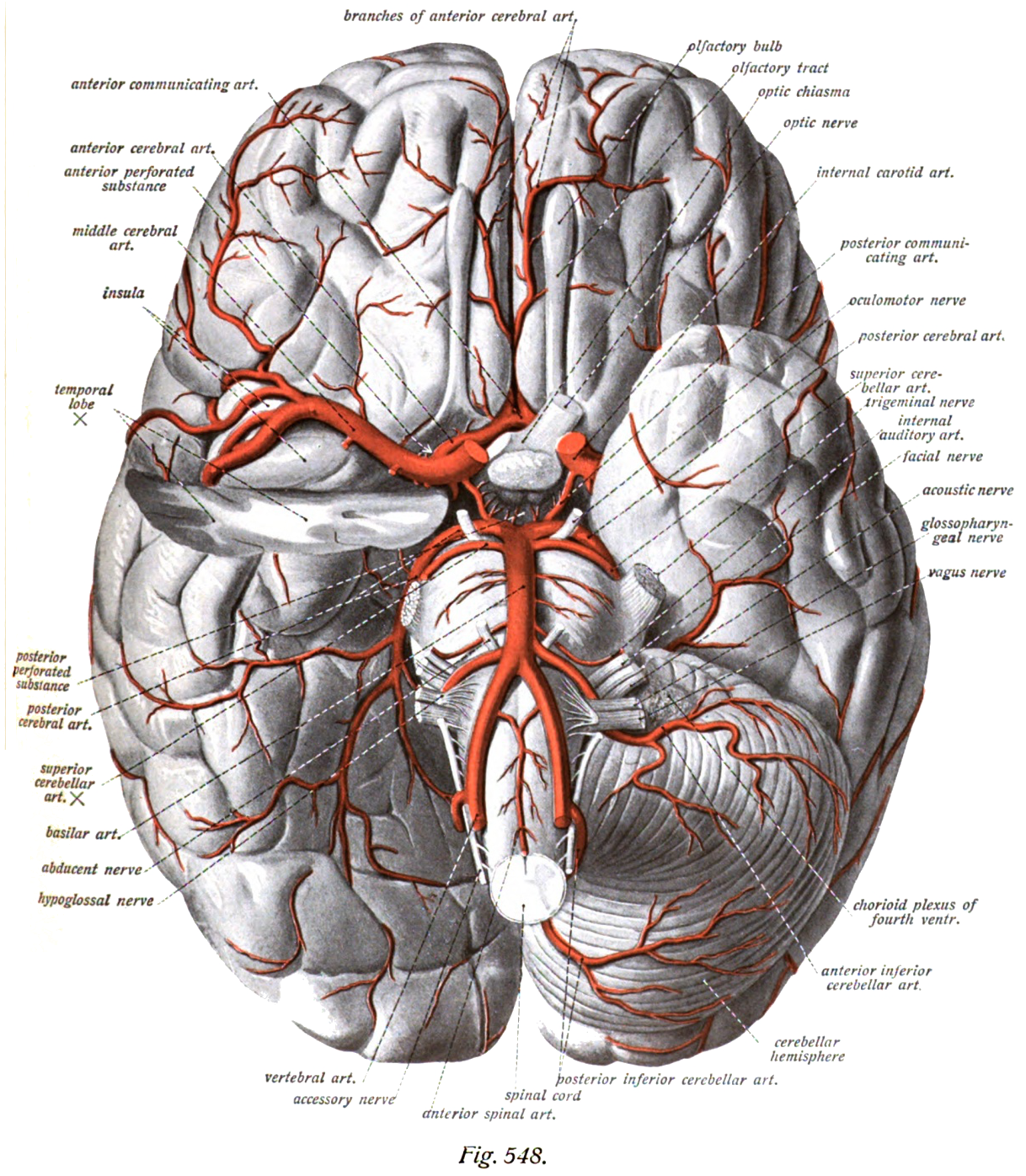
- Arterial supply of the brain

Details
- Location: around the brain
- Function: small connections (anastamoses) between the areas supplied by the major arteries of the brain.

The leptomeningeal collateral circulation (also known as leptomeningeal anastomoses or pial collaterals) is a network of small blood vessels in the brain that connects branches of the middle, anterior and posterior cerebral arteries (MCA, ACA, and PCA), with variation in its precise anatomy between individuals. During a stroke, leptomeningeal collateral vessels allow limited blood flow when other, larger blood vessels provide inadequate blood supply to a part of the brain.

== Structure ==
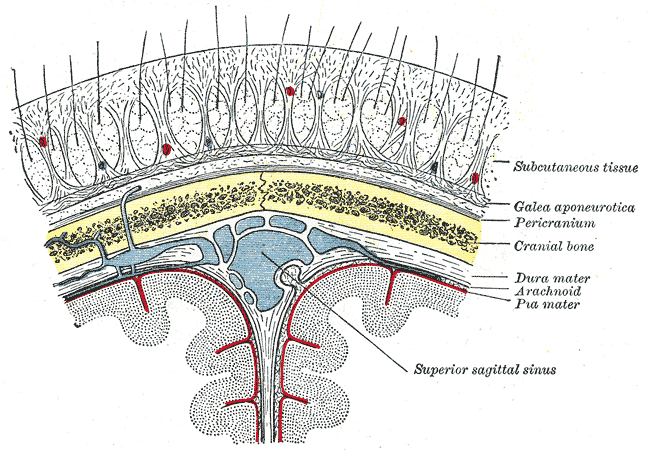
Layers of the skull and brain

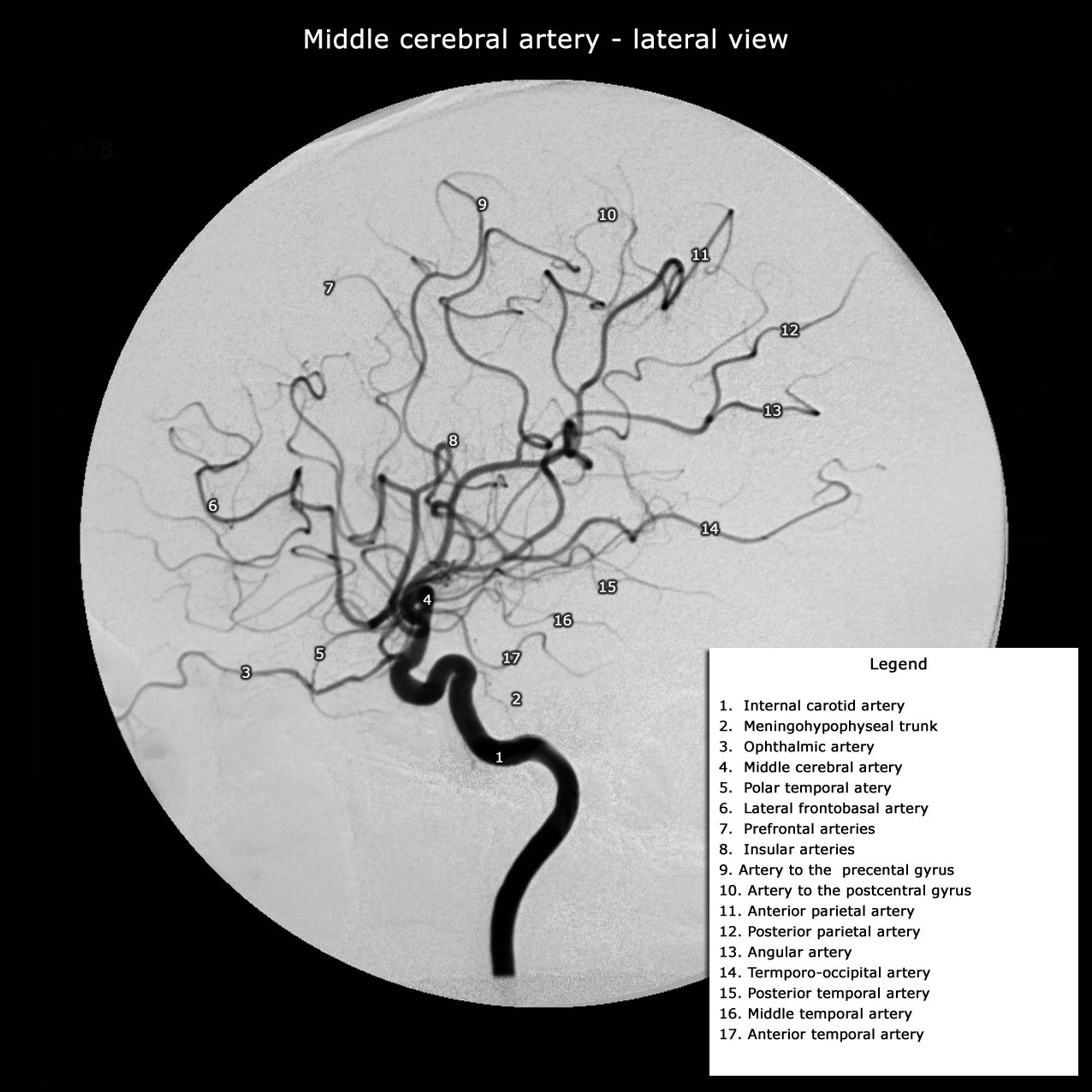
The middle cerebral artery and its branches

Leptomeningeal collaterals lie within the leptomeninges, the two deep layers of the meninges called the pia mater and the arachnoid mater. Their diameter has been measured at approximately 300 micrometers, but there is variability between individuals in the size, quantity and location of these vessels, and between either hemisphere within the same subject.

Inter-territorial end to end anastomoses exist between branches of the anterior cerebral artery and middle cerebral artery, the posterior cerebral artery and middle cerebral artery, the anterior cerebral artery and posterior cerebral artery, and the right and left anterior cerebral arteries. Intra-territorial anastamoses connect adjacent arterial branches within the same arterial territory (between two branches of the same middle cerebral artery, for example).

Inter-territorial leptomeningeal anastamoses relative to branches of the middle cerebral artery
Supplying the Frontal Lobe
Prefrontal arteries	No anastamoses observed
Orbito-frontal (lateral frontobasal) artery	Anterior and inferior frontal arteries (branches of the anterior cerebral artery)
Precentral (pre-rolandic) artery	Posterior inferior frontal artery (a branch of the anterior cerebral artery)
Central (rolandic) artery	Paracentral artery (a branch of the anterior cerebral artery)
Supplying the Parietal Lobe
Anterior parietal artery	Precuneal artery (a branch of the anterior cerebral artery)
Posterior parietal artery	No anastamoses observed
Angular artery	Parieto-occipital artery (a branch of the posterior cerebral artery)
Temporo-occipital	No anastamoses observed
Supplying the Temporal Lobe
Posterior temporal artery	No anastamoses observed
Middle temporal artery	No anastamoses observed
Anterior temporal artery	Anterior temporal artery (a branch of the posterior cerebral artery)
Temporopolar artery	No anastamoses observed

Inter-territorial leptomeningeal anastamoses between the posterior cerebral artery and anterior cerebral artery have been observed between the parieto-occipital branch of the posterior cerebral artery, and the precuneal branch or the posterior pericallosal branch of the anterior cerebral artery.

Inter-territorial leptomeningeal anastamoses between the right and left anterior cerebral arteries have been observed between the right and left pericallosal arteries and the right and left callosal marginal arteries. Anastamoses have also been observed between precuneal branches originating from the middle portion of the pericallosal artery, or from the posterior portion of the callosal marginal branch of one side joining the opposite paracentral branch.

There is anatomical variation in collateral circulation from person to person, and as we age, collateral vessels decrease in diameter and number.

== Function ==
Leptomeningeal collateral vessels allow limited cerebral blood flow and brain tissue perfusion when the brain receives insufficient blood supply through an artery, via a series of anastomotic connections between cerebral arteries.

== Clinical significance ==
=== Stroke ===
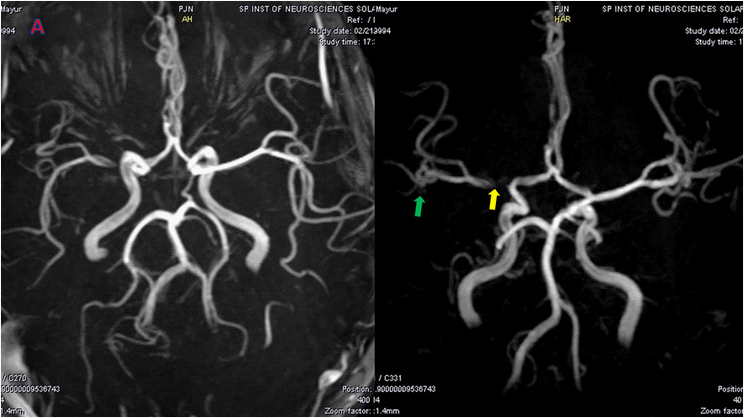
Middle cerebral artery angiography, showing stenosis

During an ischaemic stroke, blood flow through a cerebral artery is compromised. This frequently causes substantial injury to the area of the brain supplied by the artery, but not all of this territory is necessarily affected. A post mortem study of middle cerebral artery strokes demonstrated that the area of brain injury was often smaller than the total area supplied by the middle cerebral artery. Leptomeningeal collateral vessels from the anterior cerebral artery and posterior cerebral artery appeared to allow for perfusion of some brain tissue to persist, partially compensating for the loss of the major vessel. This compensatory effect is however usually inadequate to maintain a normal blood supply.

Therapies that attempt to optimize leptomeningeal collateral circulation appear to improve outcomes following acute ischaemic stroke.

MRI and CT brain imaging is used to determine the severity of a stroke, and help guide treatment. Fluid attenuated inversion recovery (FLAIR) vascular hyperintensity (FVH) is a radiographic marker seen on brain imaging in acute ischaemic stroke. FVH can be used as a proxy for slow leptomeningeal collateral blood flow, and may help reveal which areas of brain tissue are potentially salvageable.

=== Alzheimer’s disease ===
The age-related changes that can be seen in leptomeningeal vessels over time appear to be accelerated by Alzheimer's disease, according to mouse models conducted in 2018.

=== Intracranial haemorrhage ===
A 2016 study compared patients awaiting carotid artery stenting for unilateral atherosclerotic plaques. Those with leptomeningeal collaterals evident on cranial angiography had a higher incidence of intracranial haemorrhage (ICH) after stenting. The authors argued that the presence of such collaterals on imaging should be considered a risk factor for ICH in patients where carotid stenting is otherwise indicated.

== History ==
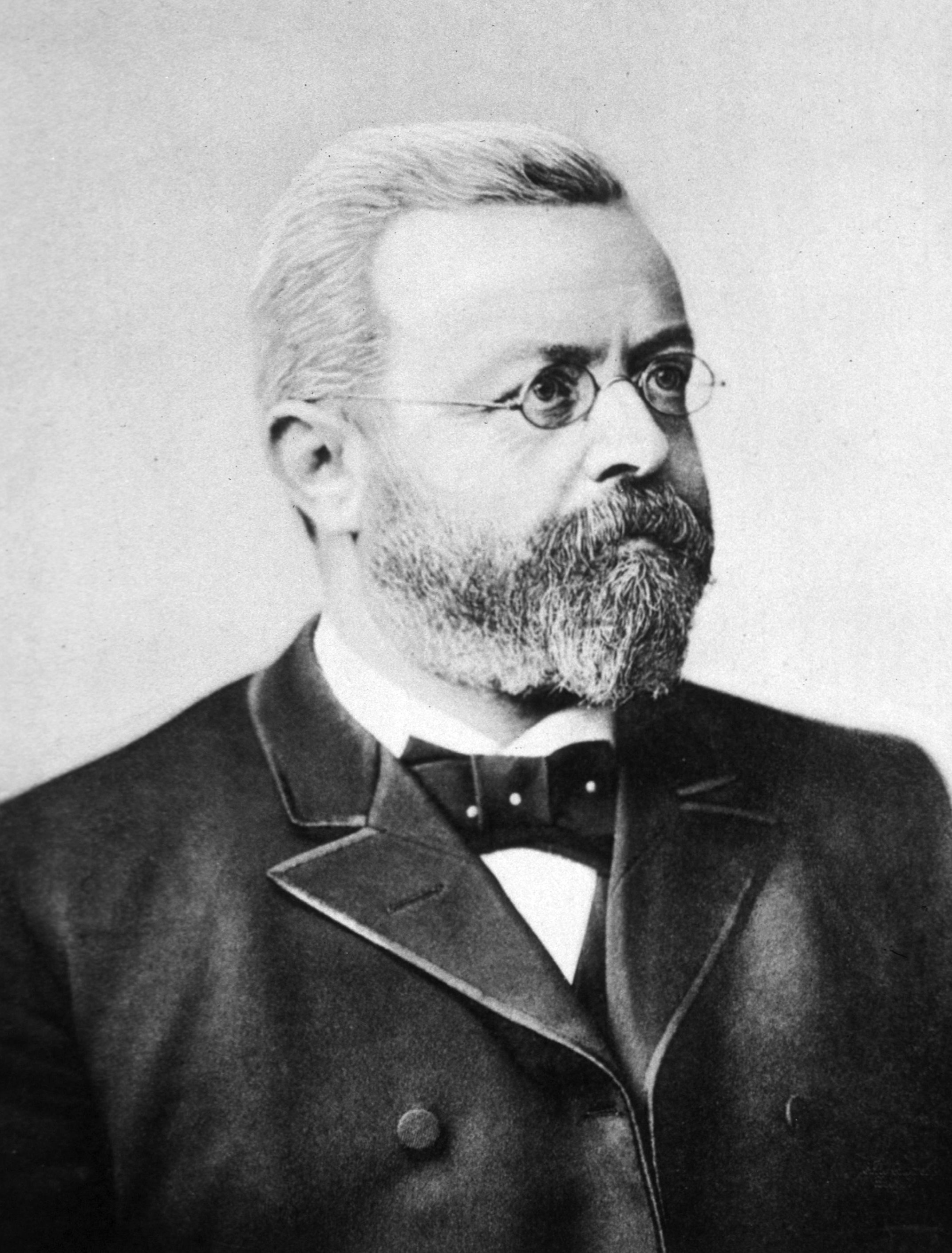
Johann Otto Leonhard Heubner

The term 'leptomeningeal' derives from the Greek word leptos (λεπτός) meaning thin, in reference to the appearance of the pia mater and arachnoid mater.

Descriptions of leptomeningeal collateral vessels are found in Thomas Willis’ Cerebri Anatome (1664). German physician Otto Heubner first demonstrated their presence in his 1874 work Die luetische Erkrankung Der Hirnaterien. He injected the middle cerebral artery, anterior cerebral artery and posterior cerebral artery in turn, in an attempt to establish the territories these arteries supply. Even when other anastomoses from the circle of Willis were blocked off, the whole cerebral arterial tree could be filled. Later study in the 1950s and 60s by H.M. Vander Eecken and R.D. Adams provided a comprehensive review of the anatomy of the leptomeningeal collateral circulation.

The concept of the ischaemic penumbra, where brain tissue shows capacity to recover if perfusion is quickly restored, was defined in 1981 by Astrup et al. Persistent blood flow through leptomeningeal vessels is a key part of this recovery.

== Other animals ==
Haemodynamic studies of leptomeningeal collaterals have been conducted in primates. Leptomeningeal circulation has been observed in mice and rats during experiments to assess changes associated with disease and ageing in these vessels.
