= Posterior communicating artery =

Arteries at the base of the brain that form part of the circle of Willis

- Schematic representation of the arterial circle and arteries of the brain (inferior view). Blood flows up to the brain through the vertebral arteries and the internal carotid arteries.

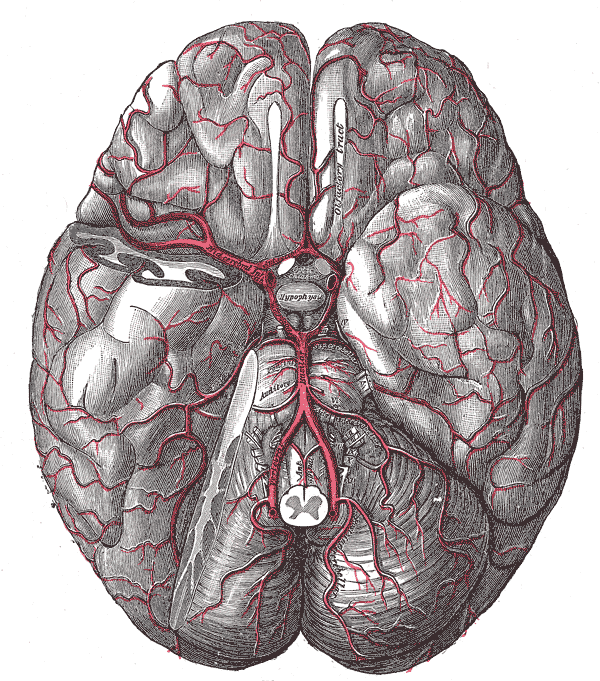
- The brain and the arteries of the base of the brain, viewed from below, with the front of the brain at the top of the image. The temporal pole of the cerebrum and a portion of the cerebellar hemisphere have been removed on the right side.

Details

Identifiers
- Latin: arteria cerebri communicans posterior
- TA98: A12.2.06.018
- TA2: 4521
- FMA: 50084

In human anatomy, the left and right posterior communicating arteries are small arteries at the base of the brain that form part of the circle of Willis.

Anteriorly, it unites with the internal carotid artery (ICA) (prior to the terminal bifurcation of the ICA into the anterior cerebral artery and middle cerebral artery); posteriorly, it unites with the posterior cerebral artery.

With the anterior communicating artery, the posterior communicating arteries establish a system of collateral circulation in cerebral circulation.

== Anatomy ==
The arteries contribute to the blood supply of the optic tract.

The two posterior communicating arteries often differ in size.

=== Relations ===
Each posterior communicating artery is situated within the interpeduncular cistern, superolateral to the pituitary gland. Each are is situated upon the medial surface of the ipsilateral cerebral peduncle and adjacent to the anterior perforated substance.

The ipsilateral oculomotor nerve (CN III) passes inferolaterally to the artery (pathology of the artery may thus compress the CN III).

=== Development ===
The development of the posterior cerebral artery (PCA) in the fetal brain occurs relatively late and arises from the fusion of several embryonic vessels near the caudal end of the posterior communicating artery.

The PCA begins as a continuation of the posterior communicating artery in 70-90% of fetuses with the remainder of PCAs having a basilar origin. The fetal carotid origin of the PCA usually regresses as the vertebral and basilar arteries become dominant and it finds a new origin in the basilar artery. About 20% of adults retain PCA origin from the posterior communicating artery, and in turn, the internal carotid arteries.

== Function ==
The brain is supplied with blood by the internal carotid arteries and also by the posterior cerebral arteries; the posterior communicating arteries connects the two systems. This provides redundancies or collaterals in the cerebral circulation so that, if one system is blocked or narrowed, the other can take over.

== Clinical significance ==
Aneurysms of the posterior communicating artery are the third most common circle of Willis aneurysm (the most common are anterior communicating artery aneurysms) and can lead to oculomotor nerve palsy.
