= Communicating artery =

Communicating artery may refer to:

- Anterior communicating artery (arteria communicans anterior)
- Posterior communicating artery (arteria communicans posterior)
