= Collateral circulation =

Alternate blood flow around a blockage

Identifiers
- MeSH: D003097

Collateral circulation is the alternate circulation around a blocked artery or vein via another path, such as nearby minor vessels. It may occur via preexisting vascular redundancy (analogous to engineered redundancy), as in the circle of Willis in the brain, or it may occur via new branches formed between adjacent blood vessels (neovascularization), as in the eye after a retinal embolism or in the brain when an instance of arterial constriction occurs due to Moyamoya disease. Its formation may be related by pathological conditions such as high vascular resistance or ischaemia. It is occasionally also known as accessory circulation, auxiliary circulation, or secondary circulation. It has surgically created analogues in which shunts or anastomoses are constructed to bypass circulatory problems.

An example of the usefulness of collateral circulation is a systemic thromboembolism in cats. This is when a thrombotic embolus lodges above the external iliac artery (common iliac artery), blocking the external and internal iliac arteries and effectively shutting off all blood supply to the hind leg. Even though the main vessels to the leg are blocked, enough blood can get to the tissues in the leg via the collateral circulation to keep them alive.

== Brain ==
Blood flow to the brain in humans and some other animals is maintained via a network of collateral arteries that anastomose (join) in the circle of Willis, which lies at the base of the brain. In the circle of Willis so-called communicating arteries exist between the front (anterior) and back (posterior) parts of the circle of Willis, as well as between the left and right side of the circle of Willis.

Leptomeningeal collateral circulation is another anastomosis in the brain.

== Heart ==
Another example in humans and some other animals is after an acute myocardial infarction (heart attack). Collateral circulation in the heart tissue will sometimes bypass the blockage in the main artery and supply enough oxygenated blood to enable the cardiac tissue to survive and recover.

== Eye ==
Collateral tortuous vein (center, left) in central retinal vein occlusion, revealed by laser Doppler imaging.

After central retinal vein occlusion, neovascularization may restore some blood flow to the retina, but the new vessels' bulk also presents a risk of causing acute glaucoma by blocking the drainage of aqueous humour. Collateral circulation is created (within months) around the blocked central vein via a generally winding path, usually from a branch vein to the choroid.

== Hand ==
The circulatory system of the human hand features extensive collateral circulation in the form of the deep and superficial palmar arches, and the proper palmar digital arteries of the digits, with the exception of the thumb, which has its blood supplied by the princeps pollicis artery. As each finger has two proper digital arteries, blood can be supplied to specific digits if one of the two is injured.

== Truncal venous system ==
Hepatic cirrhosis arising from congestion in the hepatic portal vein may give rise to collateral circulation between branches of the portal and caval veins of the liver, or between the two caval veins. Consequences of newly established venous collaterals arising from portal hypertension include esophageal varices and hemorrhoids (portocaval collateral circulation).
