= Middle cerebral artery syndrome =

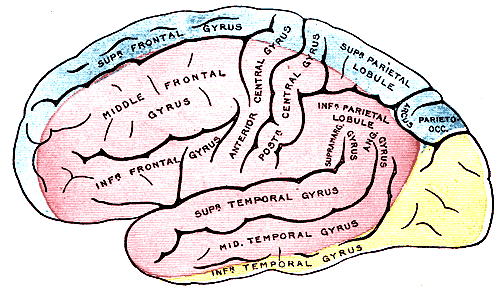
- Outer surface of cerebral hemisphere, showing areas supplied by cerebral arteries. (Pink is region supplied by middle cerebral artery.)
- Specialty: Neurology

Middle cerebral artery syndrome is a condition whereby the blood supply from the middle cerebral artery (MCA) is restricted, leading to a reduction of the function of the portions of the brain supplied by that vessel: the lateral aspects of frontal, temporal and parietal lobes, the corona radiata, globus pallidus, caudate and putamen. The MCA is the most common site for the occurrence of ischemic stroke.

Depending upon the location and severity of the occlusion, signs and symptoms may vary within the population affected with MCA syndrome. More distal blockages tend to produce milder deficits due to more extensive branching of the artery and less ischemic response. In contrast, the most proximal occlusions result in widespread effects that can lead to significant cerebral edema, increased intracranial pressure, loss of consciousness and could even be fatal. In such occasions, mannitol (osmotic diuretic) or hypertonic saline are given to draw fluid out of the edematous cerebrum to minimise secondary injury. Hypertonic saline is better than mannitol, as mannitol being a diuretic will decrease the mean arterial pressure and since cerebral perfusion is mean arterial pressure minus intracranial pressure, mannitol will also cause a decrease in cerebral perfusion.

Contralateral hemiparesis and hemisensory loss of the face, upper and lower extremities is the most common presentation of MCA syndrome. Lower extremity function is more spared than that of the faciobrachial region. The majority of the primary motor and somatosensory cortices are supplied by the MCA and the cortical homunculus can, therefore, be used to localize the defects more precisely. Middle cerebral artery lesions mostly affect the dominant hemisphere i.e. the left cerebral hemisphere.

== Signs and symptoms ==
- Hemiparesis or hemiplegia of the lower half of the contralateral face
- Hemiparesis or hemiplegia of the contralateral upper and lower extremities*
- Sensory loss of the contralateral face, arm and leg*
- Ataxia of contralateral extremities*
- Speech impairments/aphasia: Broca's area, Wernicke's or Global aphasia as a result of a dominant hemisphere lesion (usually the left brain)
- Perceptual deficits: hemispatial neglect, anosognosia, apraxia, and spatial disorganization as a result of a non-dominant hemisphere lesion (usually the right brain)
- Visual disorders: déviation conjuguée, a gaze preference towards the side of the lesion; contralateral homonymous hemianopsia

Note: *faciobrachial deficits greater than that of the lower limb

== Diagnosis ==
Diagnosis in the setting of stroke can be confirmed by CT Scan or MRI for advanced investigations.
