= Orbitofrontal artery =

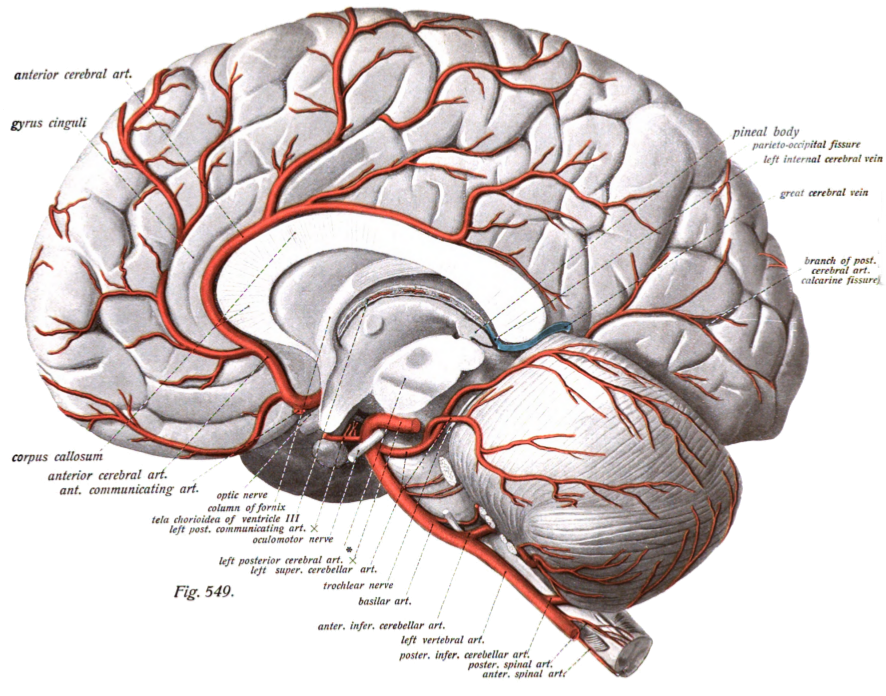
The anterior cerebral artery, with the A2 (second) branch clearly visible (seen on the left side of the image)

The orbitofrontal artery is one of the branches of the anterior cerebral artery, that supplies blood to the cerebrum. The orbitofrontal artery is usually the first cortical branch of the A2 segment, arising from the subcallosal segment to supply the inferior and inferomedial surfaces of the frontal lobe including the gyri recti.
