= Jean-Louis Prévost =

Swiss physician (1838–1927)

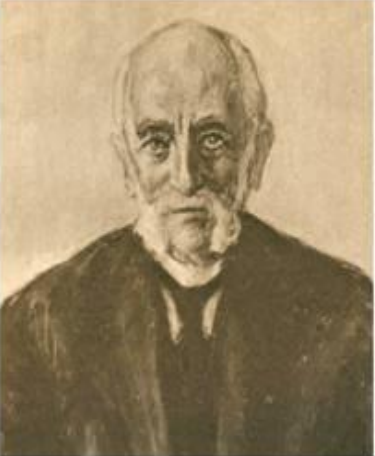
Jean-Louis Prévost (1838-1927) Swiss neurologist and physiologist

Jean-Louis Prévost (May 12, 1838 - September 12, 1927) was a Swiss neurologist and physiologist who was a native of Geneva.

He studied at Zurich, Berlin and Vienna, and in 1864 became an interne in Paris under Alfred Vulpian (1826–1887). After earning his medical doctorate at Paris in 1868, he returned to his hometown of Geneva, where he maintained a laboratory with Augustus Volney Waller (1816–1870). In 1876 he became a professor of therapy at the University of Geneva, and in 1897 succeeded Moritz Schiff (1823–1896) as professor of physiology, a position he held until 1913. Two of his better known students at Geneva were Joseph Jules Dejerine (1849–1917) and Paul Charles Dubois (1848–1918).

Prévost is credited with introducing modern medical physiological practices at Geneva, and was the author of over sixty books and articles. While still a student, he co-authored with Jules Cotard (1840–1887), a work on cerebral softening called Etudes physiologiques et pathologiques sur le ramollissment cérébral. With Jacques-Louis Reverdin (1848–1929) and Constant-Edouard Picot (1844–1931), he founded the journal Revue médicale de la Suisse.

== Associated eponym ==
- Prévost's law: Medical sign (Déviation conjuguée) involving unilateral brain lesions, where the head is rotated toward the diseased hemisphere.
- Note: He is not to be confused with Jean-Louis Prévost (1790–1850), a botanical artist and a distant relative.
