= Middle cerebral artery =

Paired artery that supplies blood to the cerebrum

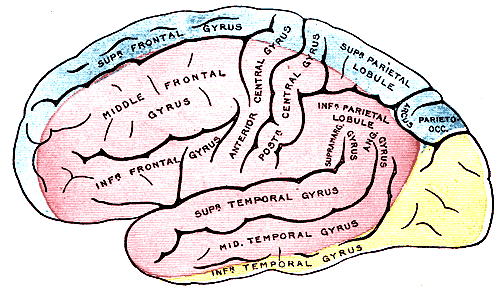
- Outer surface of cerebral hemisphere, showing areas supplied by cerebral arteries (Pink is region supplied by middle cerebral artery.)

- The arterial circle and arteries of the brain (inferior view). The middle cerebral arteries (top of figure) arise from the internal carotid arteries.

Details
- Source: Internal carotid arteries
- Branches: Anterolateral central arteries
- Vein: Middle cerebral vein
- Supplies: Cerebrum

Identifiers
- Latin: arteria cerebri media
- MeSH: D020768
- TA98: A12.2.07.046
- TA2: 4509
- FMA: 50079

The middle cerebral artery (MCA) is one of the three major paired cerebral arteries that supply blood to the cerebrum. The MCA arises from the internal carotid artery and continues into the lateral sulcus where it then branches and projects to many parts of the lateral cerebral cortex. It also supplies blood to the anterior temporal lobes and the insular cortices.

The left and right MCAs rise from trifurcations of the internal carotid arteries and thus are connected to the anterior cerebral arteries and the posterior communicating arteries, which connect to the posterior cerebral arteries. The MCAs are not considered a part of the Circle of Willis.

== Structure ==
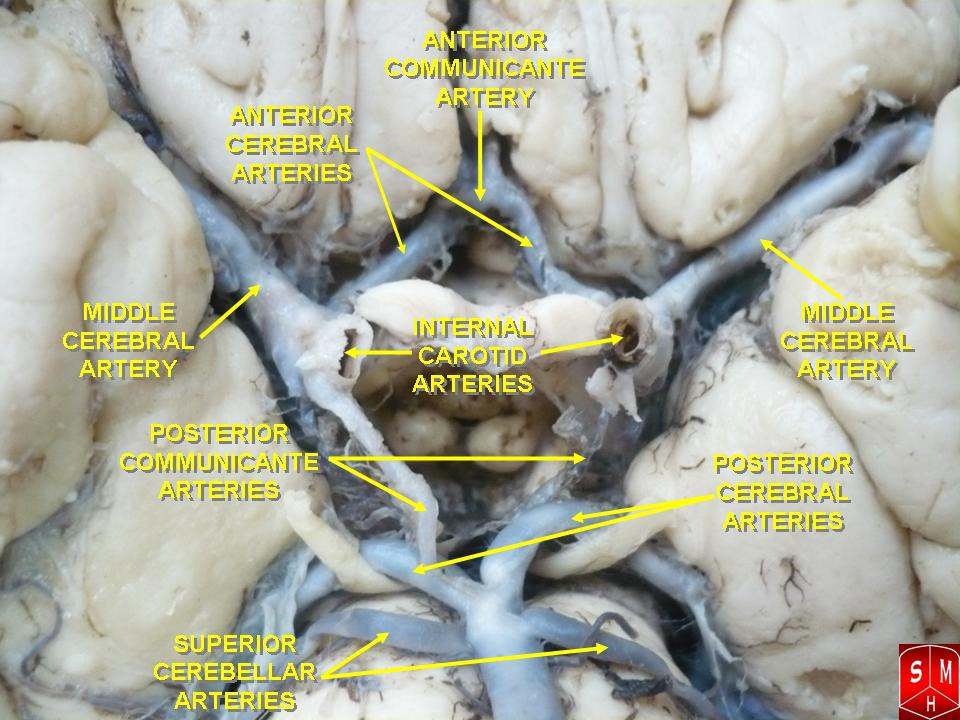
Middle cerebral artery

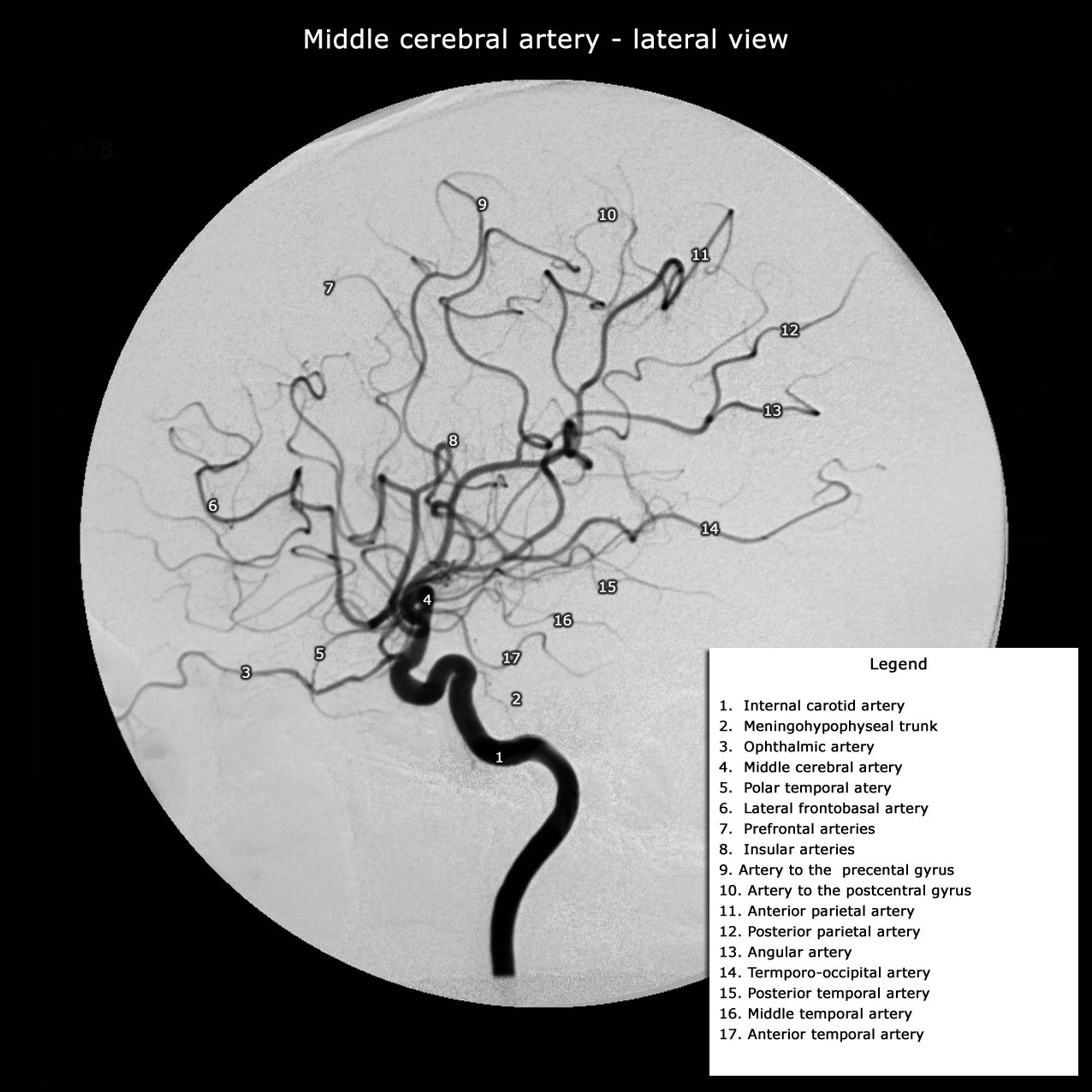
Middle cerebral artery and its branches (patient has a hypoplastic A1 segment and an absent PCOM, resulting in a purely MCA angio from internal carotid artery injection)

The middle cerebral artery divides into four segments, named by the region they supply as opposed to order of branching as the latter can be somewhat variable:

- M1: The sphenoidal segment (stem), receiving its name due to its course along the adjacent sphenoid bone. It is also referred to as the horizontal segment, though this may be misleading since the segment may descend, remain flat, or extend posteriorly the anterior (dorsad) in different individuals. The M1 segment perforates the brain with numerous anterolateral central (lateral lenticulostriate) arteries, which supply the basal ganglia.
- M2: Extending anteriorly on the insula, this segment is known as the insular segment. It is also known as the Sylvian segment when the opercular segments are included. The MCA branches may bifurcate or sometimes trifurcate into trunks in this segment which then extend into branches that terminate towards the cortex.
- M3: The opercular segment, extending laterally and exteriorly from the insula towards the cortex. This segment is sometimes grouped with M2.
- M4: These finer terminal or cortical segments irrigate the cortex. They begin at the external margins of the Sylvian fissure and extend distally away on the cortex of the brain.

The M2 and M3 segments may each split into 2 or 3 main trunks (terminal branches) with an upper trunk, lower trunk and occasionally a middle trunk. Bifurcations and trifurcations occurs in 50% and 25% of the cases respectively. Other cases include duplication of the MCA at the internal carotid artery (ICA) or an accessory MCA (AccMCA) which arise not from the ICA but as a branch from the anterior cerebral artery. The middle trunk that exist in parts of the population, when present provides the pre-Rolandic, Rolandic, anterior parietal, posterior parietal and the angular artery for irrigation instead of the upper and lower trunks.

The branches of the MCA can be described by the areas that they irrigate.

=== Frontal lobe ===
- Lateral frontobasal (orbitiofrontal): This artery branches out anteriorly, superiorly and laterally to vascularize the inferior frontal gyrus. It "competes" in size with the frontal polar branch of the anterior cerebral artery
- Prefrontal arteries: These arteries fan out over the insula and exit to the cortex via the medial surface of the frontal operculum. The arteries fan superiorly over the pars triangularis and vascularize the inferior and middle frontal gyrus. Near the superior frontal gyrus these arteries anastomose with branches from the pericallosal artery of the anterior cerebral artery.
- Pre-Rolandic artery (precentral): The artery extends out on the medial surface of the operculum and supplies the posterior parts of the middle and inferior frontal gyri as well as the lower parts of the pre-central gyrus. This artery branches once or twice and is relatively invariant across anatomies.
- Rolandic arteries (central): The artery extends out and exits from the central portion of the operculum then passes inside the central sulcus. This artery bifurcates in 72% of individuals and irrigates the posterior pre-central gyrus and the inferior portion of the post-central gyrus.

=== Parietal lobe ===
- Anterior parietal: This artery usually originates from a distal MCA branch. In some cases it branches from the rolandic artery or from the posterior parietal artery. It extends the length of interparietal sulcus and descends slightly posteriorly.
- Posterior parietal: Emerges from the posterior end of the Sylvian fissure and extends first posteriorly, and then anteriorly along the posterior of the parietal lobe. It also branches to the supramarginal gyrus.
- Angular: The angular artery is a significant terminal branch of the anterior or middle trunk of the MCA. It emerges from the Sylvian fissure and passes over the anterior transverse temporal gyrus and usually divides into two branches. One of the branches supplies the angular gyrus while the other supplies the supramarginal gyrus, posterior superior temporal gyrus, and the parietooccipital arcus (sulcus).
- Temporooccipital: The longest cortical artery, it runs posteriorly opposite to the center of the operculum. Upon its exit from the Sylvian fissure, it runs parallel to the superior temporal sulcus and supplies the superior and inferior occipital gyri. This vessel anastamoses with the posterior cerebral artery and may exist as one or two arteries, 67% or 33% of the time, respectively.

=== Temporal lobe ===
- Temporopolar: The artery extends from the sphenoidal segment of the MCA via the inferior surface of the operculum and supplies the polar and anterior lateral portions of the temporal lobe. The vessel can be identified in 52% of normal angiograms
- Anterior temporal: This artery typically arises from the proximal MCA trunk and extends in the similar fashion as the temporopolar artery and vascularizes the same regions.
- Middle temporal: This artery extends from the Sylvian fissure opposite to the inferior frontal gyrus and supplies superior and middle portions of the middle temporal lobe. It can be identified in 79% of angiograms.
- Posterior temporal: This artery extends out and away from the operculum and turns in a step-wise manner first inferiorly then posteriorly into the superior temporal sulcus then to the middle temporal sulcus. This vessel supplies posterior portion of the temporal lobe and is the origin of several perforating arteries that irrigate the insula. It is readily identifiable in most radiograms.

== Function ==
Areas supplied by the middle cerebral artery include:

- The bulk of the lateral surface of the hemisphere; except for the superior inch of the frontal and parietal lobe (anterior cerebral artery), and the inferior part of the temporal lobe.
- Superior division supplies lateroinferior frontal lobe (location of Broca's area i.e. language expression)
- Inferior division supplies lateral temporal lobe (location of Wernicke's area i.e. language comprehension)
- Deep branches supply the basal ganglia as well as the internal capsule

MCA occlusion site and resulting Aphasia

- Global – trunk of MCA
- Broca – anterior branch of MCA
- Wernicke – posterior branch of MCA

== Clinical significance ==
=== Occlusion ===
Occlusion of the middle cerebral artery results in Middle cerebral artery syndrome, potentially showing the following defects:

1. Paralysis (-plegia) or weakness (-paresis) of the contralateral face and arm (faciobrachial)
2. Sensory loss of the contralateral face and arm.
3. Damage to the dominant hemisphere (usually the left hemisphere) results in aphasia (i.e. Broca's area or Wernicke's)
4. Damage to the non-dominant hemisphere (usually the right hemisphere) results in contralateral neglect syndrome, inaccurate localization in the half field, impaired ability to judge distance (nondominant parietal lobe).
5. Large MCA infarcts often have déviation conjuguée, a gaze preference towards the side of the lesion, especially during the acute period. Contralateral homonymous hemianopsia is often present.

== See also ==
- Leptomeningeal collateral circulation
