= Convection enhanced delivery =

Drug delivery technique

Convection-enhanced delivery (CED) is method of drug delivery in which the drug is delivered into the brain using bulk flow rather than conventional diffusion. This is done by utilizing catheters inserted into the target region of the brain and utilizing pressure to deliver the therapeutic to a target region. CED has been used to deliver drugs to the central nervous system (CNS) for diseases such as cancer, epilepsy, and Parkinson's disease. CED has been used to deliver drugs to the CNS for its ability to bypass the blood–brain barrier (BBB) and target specific regions for targeted treatment, but current techniques using CED have failed to progress past clinical trials due to a variety of physical limitations associated with CED itself.

== Background ==
The blood brain barrier (BBB) has historically proved to be a very difficult obstacle to overcome when aiming to deliver a drug to the brain. In order to overcome the difficulties in delivering therapeutic levels of drug past the BBB, drugs had to either be lipophilic molecules with a molecular weight below 600 Da or be transported across the BBB using some sort of cellular transport system. In the 1990s, a research group led by Edward Oldfield at the National Institutes of Health proposed utilizing CED to deliver drugs and molecules too big to bypass the BBB to the brain. CED is also useful to delivery drugs that have poor diffusive properties and allows for targeted placement of the catheter used to deliver the drugs. A vast majority of current clinical studies using CED are currently using CED as a method to treat brain tumors that are inoperable or have shown little response to conventional therapies.

== Mechanism of action ==
CED is a method of drug delivery in which a pressure gradient is created at the tip of a catheter to use bulk flow rather than diffusion to delivery drugs into the brain. Diffusion has been limited by the diffusivity of the tissue, and can be expressed using Fick's law, $J = -D\nabla C$, where J is diffusion, D is the diffusivity of the targeted tissue, and $\nabla C$ is the concentration gradient of the drug. Diffusion is can only be modified by the concentration gradient of a drug, meaning that in order to deliver drug to large parts of a tissue, high concentrations of a drug are needed in order to promote diffusion, which can result in toxicity. In comparison, bulk flow is limited only by Darcy's law, defined as $v = -K\nabla p$, where v is velocity, K is the hydraulic conductivity of the molecule, and $\nabla p$ is the pressure gradient. Using bulk flow to deliver a drug can mean a drug can be delivered further into a target tissue with higher pressure, resulting in lower concentrations and less risk of drug toxicity.

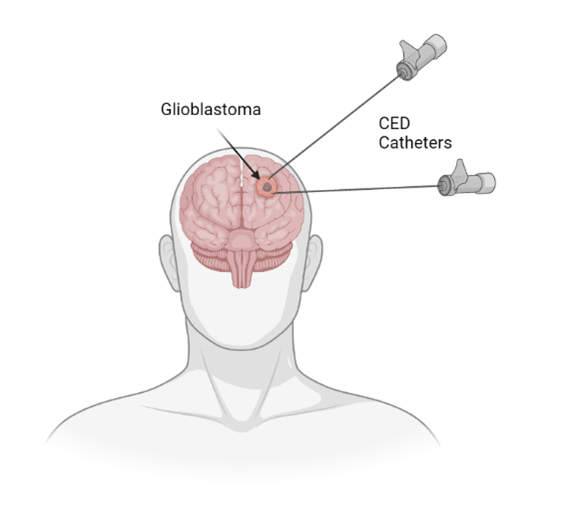
Diagram showing clinical usage of CED to treat glioblastoma

To perform a CED treatment, catheters are inserted through burr holes drilled into the skull. Treatments can use multiple catheters for a single delivery if that is required. The catheters are inserted into the interstitial space of the brain using image guidance. Once the catheters are placed at the desired site, the catheters are connection to an infusion pump which is used to create the pressure gradient for bulk flow. Infusion rates are typically set to 0.1-10 μL/min and the drug is delivered into the interstitial space, displacing any extracellular fluid. CED can result in delivery of drug centimeters deep into the tissue from the delivery site, rather than the millimeters deep that would result from delivery of drugs via diffusion.

== Clinical trials evaluating CED ==
Current clinical trials exploring the use of CED to date have not resulted in any FDA approved treatments. These clinical trials have mostly been focused on using CED to treat glioblastoma and only two studies have been able to progress to stage 3 clinical trials. The first study began in 2004 and was comparing the efficacy of cintredekin besudotox delivered using CED and gliadel for the treatment of glioblastoma multiform. Results from this study showed similar survival rates between the two groups, but patients who were given CED treatment had higher rates of pulmonary emboli. The second stage 3 clinical trial began in 2008 and was delivering trabedersen via CED to treat anaplastic astrocytoma glioblastoma. This trial was terminated early due to the inability to recruit enough trial participants and efficacy of CED in this treatment was not established. These two studies have been the only major clinical trials which have compared the efficacy of CED treatment to current clinical standards for treatment.

While CED clinical trials have primarily explored treating brain tumors, other conditions involving the brain have also been investigated in clinical trials. To date there have been 2 registered clinical trials, both in stage 1, which aim to use CED to treat Parkinson's disease. The first trial, which was registered in 2009, was withdrawn in 2017 for unknown reasons. The other clinical trial, which reached completion in 2022, delivered an adenovirus (AAV2) encoding for a glial cell line derived neurotropic growth factor (GDNF) directly into the brain using CED. GDNF is known to protect neurons which produce dopamine. Parkinson's disease has been shown to decrease the amount of dopamine which can be produced in the brain, so researchers hope to be able to decrease the side effects of Parkinson's disease by protecting neurons which produce dopamine. While results from this study have not been published as of April 2022, the pre-clinical research done in a Parkinson's disease model rhesus monkey showed that CED treatment with AAV2-GDNF resulted in neurological improvement without significant side effects.

== Non-clinical research ==
Even though current clinical trials have not yet resulted in an FDA approved treatment, there is still plenty of research being done on delivering different types of therapeutics and treating different diseases being done. One of these areas of research is the visualization of the region of treatment. One research group was able visualize the regions of the brain that received drug from bulk flow mixing the desired drug with Gd-DTPA, a common MRI contrast agent. This allowed researchers to immediately take an MRI post CED treatment to assess if the drug was reaching the targeted area. Research has also tagged nanocarriers of their therapeutic with the MRI contrast gadoteridol for real time treatment imaging. Other than MRI contrasts, it has been shown to be possible to tag a therapeutic microcarrier with a radiolabeled or fluorescent molecule that can then be excited during imaging. The biggest limitation of this drug distribution visualization is that this technique only works ex vivo. One research group was able to optimize their liposomal design using this technique, showing the usefulness of this technique.

While a common use of CED is to directly deliver drugs to the brain, it is also possible to deliver non-chemical therapeutics, such as proteins or growth factors, using CED. There are several types of microcarriers which have been used for CED, including nanospheres, nanoparticles, liposomes, micelles, and dendrites. Nanocarriers have several unique benefits for delivering therapeutics compared to conventional drug solutions. Firstly, nanocarriers can be modified to create an optimal carrier for the system that is being developed. These modifications can include tagging them for imaging, size, charge, osmolarity, viscosity, and changes in surface coating.

The other large area of research being done currently on CED is the translation of CED from being used for brain tumors to other brain diseases. The primary conditions being researched for non-cancerous treatments include Parkinson's disease and epilepsy. Animal model research using CED to deliver therapeutics to the brain to treat Parkinson's disease have shown 3 promising therapeutics for treatment. Researchers for these therapeutics have typically used adenovirus carriers for therapeutics since many drugs used to treat Parkinson's disease currently are not chemical based but rather gene therapy or protein based. Current research areas focus on using GDNF, a growth factor which protects dopamine producing brain cells, glutamic acid decarboxylase (GAD), which is another therapeutic that helps to protect dopamine producing brain cells, and neurturin, which is a GDNF homolog. Another reported use of CED is in the treatment of epilepsy. Current epilepsy treatments are too large to pass through the BBB, so utilizing CED to delivery these drugs is currently one of the only ways to target the brain. The two primary antiepileptic drugs (AEDs) being delivered using CED in research are conotoxin N-type calcium channel antagonists and botulinum neurotoxins. Results from these studies showed promise in reducing the risk of seizures for up to 5 days when treated with calcium channel antagonists and up to 50 days when using botulinum neurotoxins

== Limitations and future directions ==
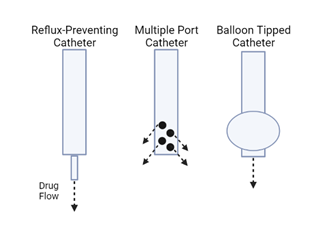
Diagram showing different catheter designs to prevent reflux during treatment. Arrows symbolize the flow of drug during convection-enhanced delivery

While there has been promise in the use of CED to delivery drugs directly into the brain, there are some drawbacks with it. A vast majority of studies to date have failed to have consistent delivery from patient to patient for technical reasons surrounding the usage of CED. Incorrect placement of catheters can result in a less effective treatment with increased risks of leaks from the brain into other parts of the central nervous system (CNS). Another, more common occurrence is the incidence or reflux of the drug back into the catheter. Reflux can cause leakage into unintended areas as well as decrease the true volume of drug delivered. CED catheter improvements are currently being researched, with some research groups modifying the tips of the catheters to prevent reflux. The design of a balloon tipped catheter for use in CED has been proposed, and results showed that drug was successfully delivered into the brain using the balloon tipped catheter without any complication. Other proposed designs include the utilization of catheters with multiple exit sites, catheters with porous tips, and catheters with tips that are smaller than the rest of the catheter. New catheter designs also aim to allow for a greater flow rate while still minimizing the risk of reflux. These improvements to the technical limitations of CED aim to help researchers determine efficacy of a treatment without worrying about failed treatments due to limitations in the equipment of CED.
