= Circle of Willis =

Circulatory anastomosis that supplies blood to the brain and surrounding structures

- Diagram of the arterial circulation at the base of the brain (inferior view), the circle of Willis is drawn in the upper half. Blood flows up to the brain through the vertebral arteries and through the internal carotid arteries.

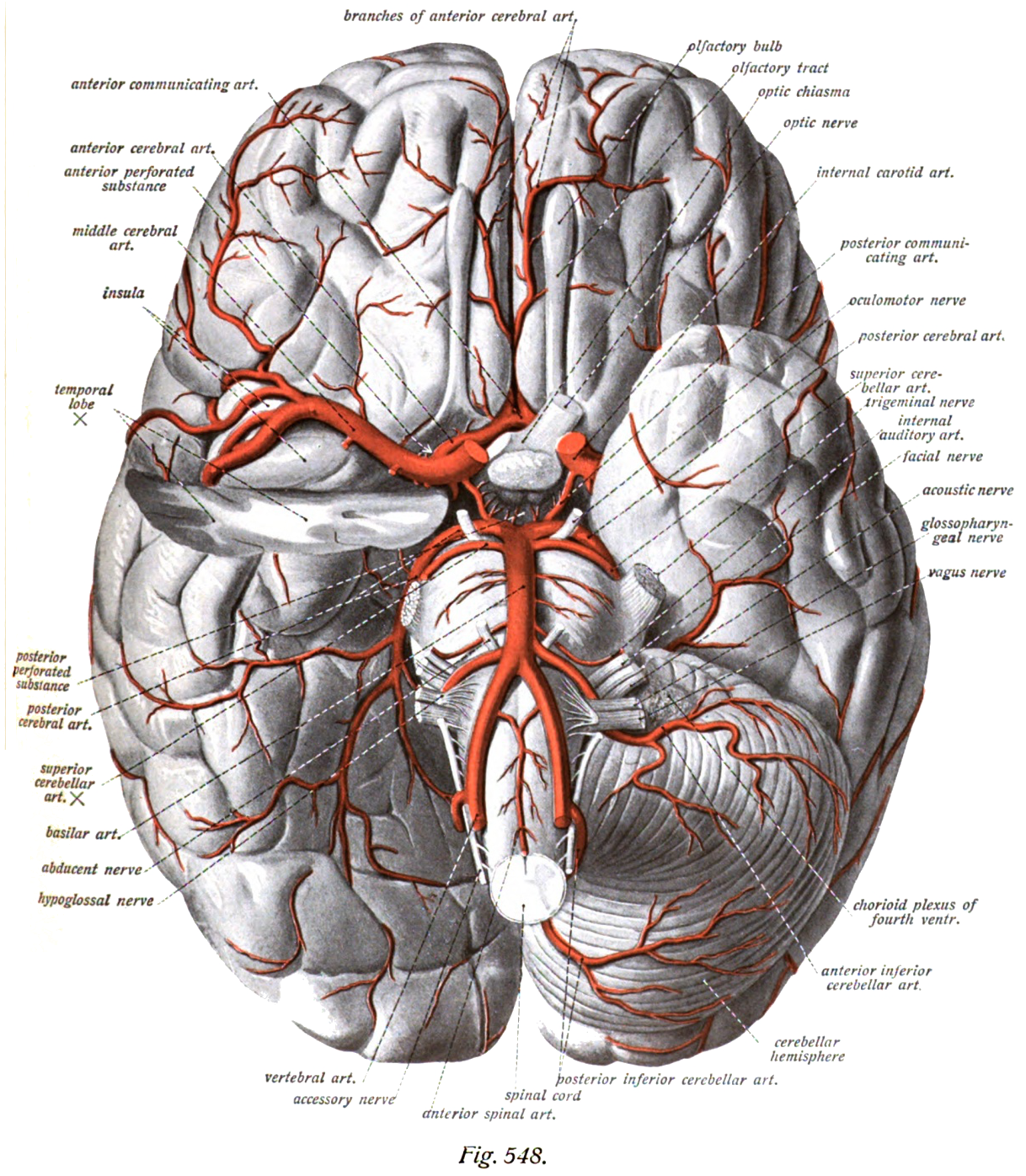
- The arteries of the base of the brain. Basilar artery labeled below center. The temporal pole of the cerebrum and the cerebellar hemisphere have been removed on the right side. Inferior aspect (viewed from below).

Details

Identifiers
- Latin: circulus arteriosus cerebri circulus Willisii
- MeSH: D002941
- TA98: A12.2.07.080
- TA2: 4516
- FMA: 50454

The circle of Willis (also called Willis' circle, loop of Willis, cerebral arterial circle, and Willis polygon) is a circulatory anastomosis that supplies blood to the brain and surrounding structures in reptiles, birds and mammals, including humans. It is named after Thomas Willis (1621–1675), an English physician and neuroanatomist.

== Structure ==
The circle of Willis is a part of the cerebral circulation and is composed of the following arteries:

- Anterior cerebral artery (left and right) at their A1 segments
- Anterior communicating artery
- Internal carotid artery (left and right) at its distal tip (carotid terminus)
- Posterior cerebral artery (left and right) at their P1 segments
- Posterior communicating artery (left and right)

=== Origin of arteries ===
The left and right internal carotid arteries arise from the left and right common carotid arteries.

The posterior communicating artery is given off as a branch of the internal carotid artery just before it divides into its terminal branches - the anterior and middle cerebral arteries. The anterior cerebral artery forms the anterolateral portion of the circle of Willis, while the middle cerebral artery does not contribute to the circle.

The right and left posterior cerebral arteries arise from the basilar artery, which is formed by the left and right vertebral arteries. The vertebral arteries arise from the subclavian arteries.

The anterior communicating artery connects the two anterior cerebral arteries and could be said to arise from either the left or right side.

All arteries involved give off cortical and central branches. The central branches supply the interior of the circle of Willis, more specifically, the Interpeduncular fossa. The cortical branches are named for the area they supply and do not directly affect the circle of Willis.

=== Variation ===
Considerable anatomic variation exists in the circle of Willis, with classic anatomy seen only in about one-third of people. In one common variation the proximal part of the posterior cerebral artery is narrow and its ipsilateral posterior communicating artery is large, so the internal carotid artery supplies the posterior cerebrum; this is known as a fetal posterior communicating cerebral artery. In another variation the anterior communicating artery is a large vessel, such that a single internal carotid supplies both anterior cerebral arteries; this is known as an azygos anterior cerebral artery.

== Function ==
The arrangement of the brain's arteries into the circle of Willis is believed to create redundancy (analogous to engineered redundancy) for collateral circulation in the cerebral circulation. If one part of the circle becomes blocked or narrowed (stenosed) or one of the arteries supplying the circle is blocked or narrowed, blood flow from the other blood vessels can often preserve the cerebral perfusion well enough to avoid the symptoms of ischemia.

However, considering that the circle of Willis is present in many non-human species (reptiles, birds and mammals), and that arterial narrowing is mostly associated with old age and the human lifestyle, more generally applicable explanations of its functions have been suggested, such as dampening of pulse pressure waves within the brain and involvement in forebrain sensing of water loss.

== Clinical significance ==
=== Aneurysms ===
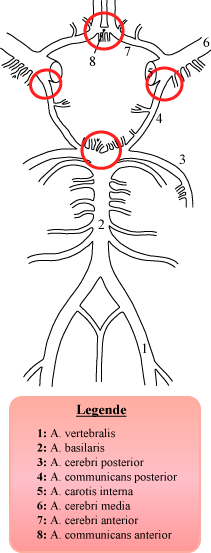
Circle of Willis with the most common locations of ruptured aneurysms marked

=== Subclavian steal syndrome ===
The adaptive flow that the circle of Willis introduces can also lead to reduced cerebral perfusion. In subclavian steal syndrome, blood is "stolen" from the vertebral artery on the affected side to preserve blood flow to the upper limb. Subclavian steal syndrome results from a proximal stenosis (narrowing) of the subclavian artery, one of arteries originating off of the aortic arch. Subclavian steal syndrome has potential to affect flow in the circle of Willis.

== Additional images ==
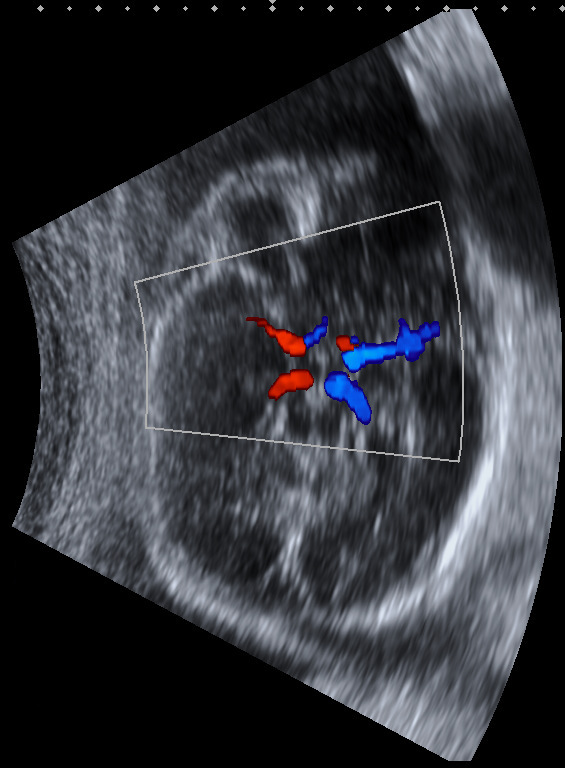
Fetal ultrasound image at the level of circle of Willis, showing PCA, MCA and ACA

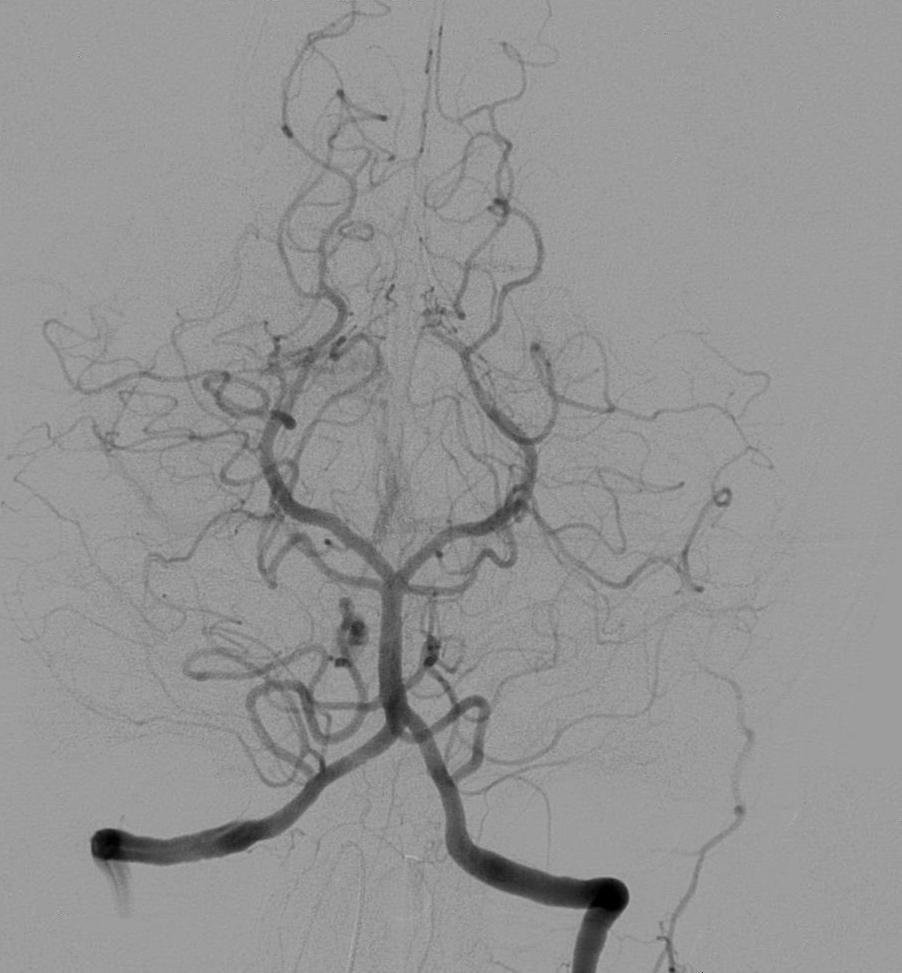
Cerebral angiogram showing an anterior/posterior projection of the vertebrobasilar and posterior cerebral circulation, the posterior aspect of the circle of Willis, and one of its feeding vessels

An anterior view of major cerebral and cerebellar arteries.

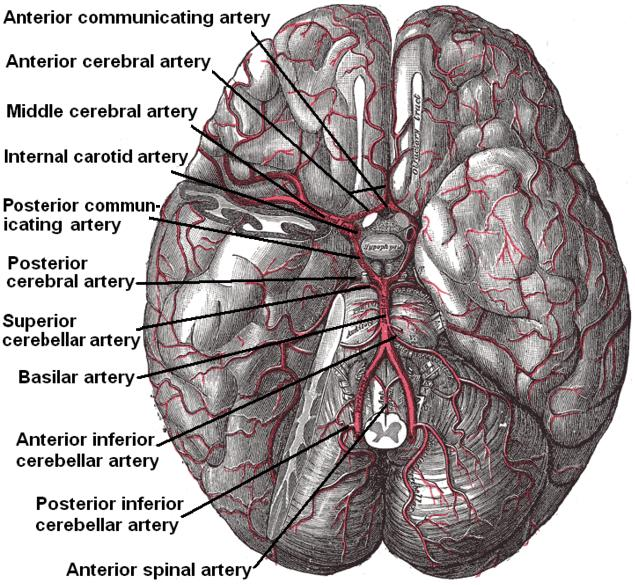

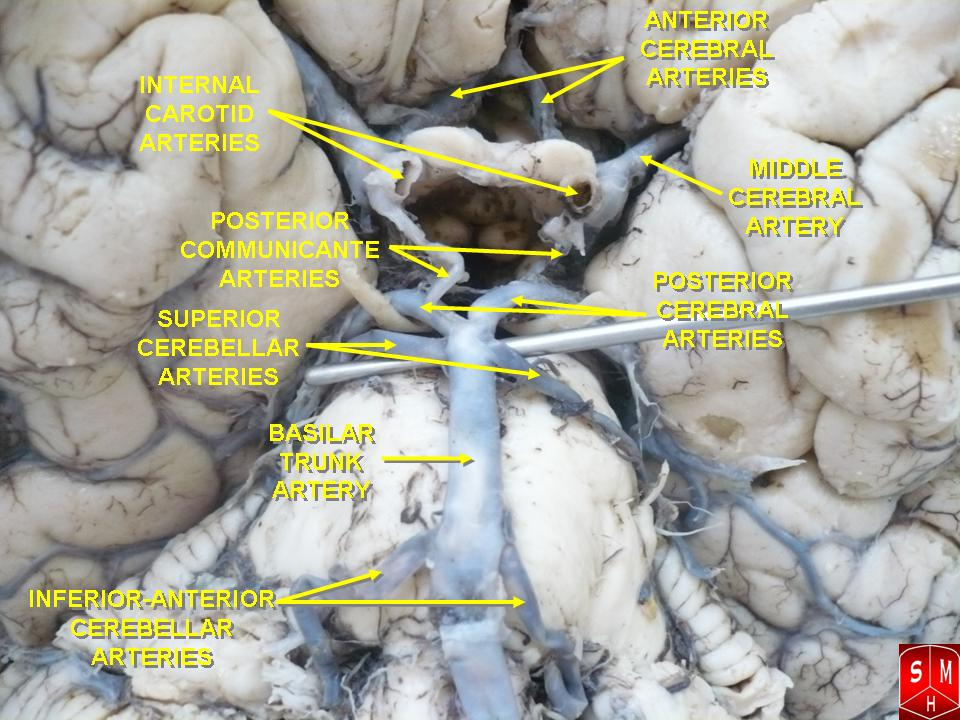
Circle of Willis

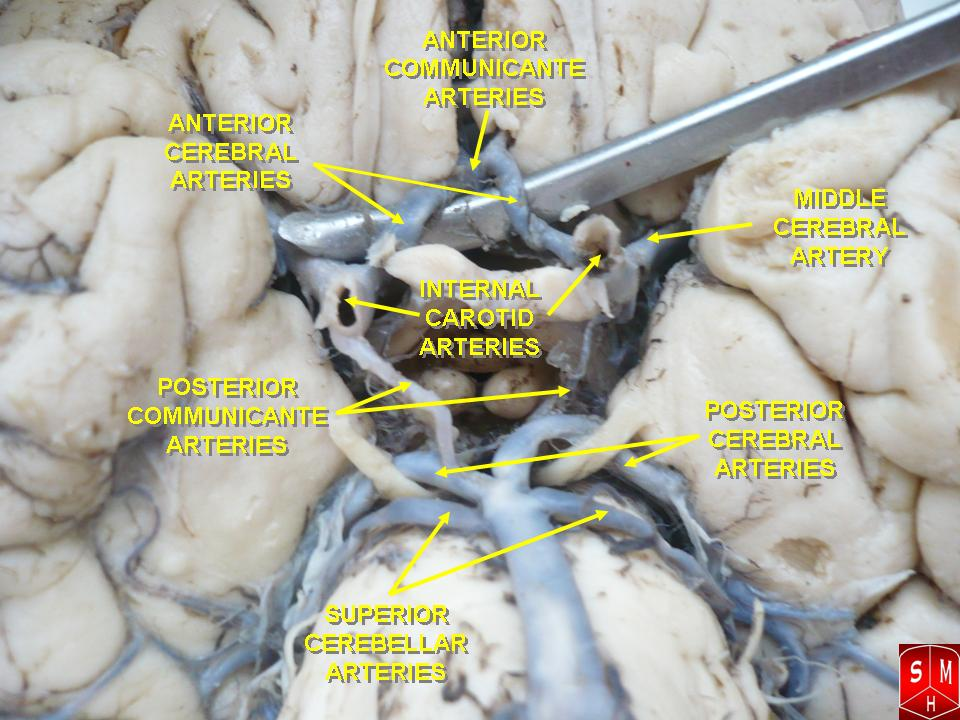
Circle of Willis

== See also ==
- Cerebral circulation
- Leptomeningeal collateral circulation
