= Anterior cerebral artery =

Artery supplying the brain

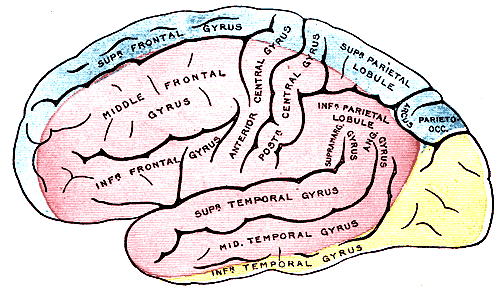
- Outer surface of cerebral hemisphere, showing areas supplied by cerebral arteries. Areas supplied by the anterior cerebral artery are shown in blue.

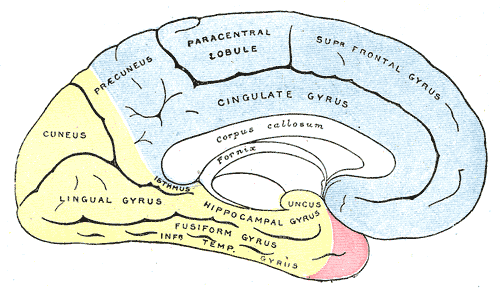
- Medial surface of cerebral hemisphere. Areas supplied by the anterior cerebral artery are shown in blue.

Details
- Source: Internal carotid artery
- Vein: Cerebral veins
- Supplies: Cerebrum

Identifiers
- Latin: arteria cerebri anterior
- MeSH: D020771
- TA98: A12.2.07.022
- TA2: 4502
- FMA: 50028

The anterior cerebral artery (ACA) is one of a pair of cerebral arteries that supplies oxygenated blood to most midline portions of the frontal lobes and superior medial parietal lobes of the brain. The two anterior cerebral arteries arise from the internal carotid artery and are part of the circle of Willis. The left and right anterior cerebral arteries are connected by the anterior communicating artery.

Anterior cerebral artery syndrome refers to symptoms that follow a stroke occurring in the area normally supplied by one of the arteries. It is characterized by weakness and sensory loss in the lower leg and foot opposite to the lesion and behavioral changes.

== Structure ==
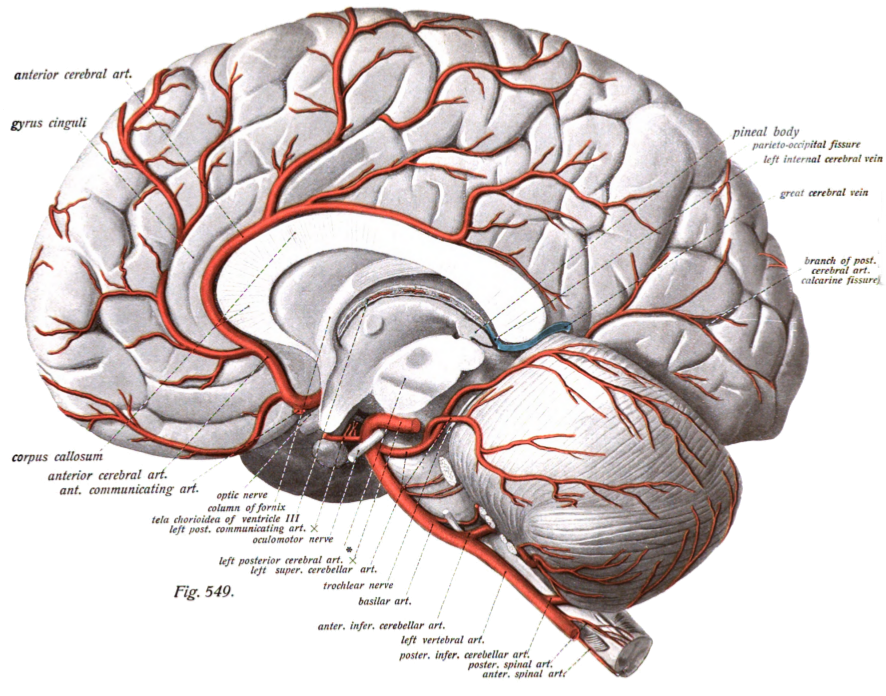
Arteries of the brain. Anterior cerebral artery labeled at the left (twice)

The anterior cerebral artery is divided into 5 segments. Its smaller branches: the callosal (supracallosal) arteries are considered to be the A4 and A5 segments.

- A1 originates from the internal carotid artery and extends to the anterior communicating artery (AComm). The anteromedial central (medial lenticulostriate) arteries arise from this segment as well as the AComm, which irrigates the caudate nucleus and the anterior limb of the internal capsule
- A2 extends from the AComm to the bifurcation forming the pericallosal and callosomarginal arteries. The recurrent artery of Heubner (distal medial striate artery), which irrigates the internal capsule, usually arises at the beginning of this segment near the AComm. Two branches arise from this segment:
  - Orbitofrontal artery (medial frontal basal): Arises a small distance away from the AComm
  - Frontopolar artery (polar frontal): Arises after the orbitofrontal, close to the curvature of A2 over the corpus callosum. It can also originate from the callosal marginal.
- A3, also termed the pericallosal artery, is one of the (or the only) main terminal branches of the ACA, which extends posteriorly in the pericallosal sulcus to form the internal parietal arteries (superior, inferior) and the precuneal artery. This artery may form an anastomosis with the posterior cerebral artery.
  - Callosal marginal artery: A commonly present terminal branch of the ACA, which bifurcates from the pericallosal artery. This artery in turn branches into the medial frontal arteries (anterior, intermediate, posterior), and the paracentral artery, with the cingulate branches arising throughout its length. Depending on anatomical variation, the callosal marginal artery may be none discrete or not be visible. In the latter case, the branches mentioned will originate from the pericallosal artery. In a study of 76 hemispheres, the artery was present in only 60% of the cases. Angiography studies cite that the vessel can be seen 67% or 50% of the time.

=== Development ===
The anterior cerebral artery develops from a primitive anterior division of the internal carotid artery that initially supplies the optic and olfactory regions. This anterior division, which appears at the twenty-eighth day of development, also forms the middle cerebral artery and the anterior choroidal artery. The anterior cerebral arteries grow toward each other and form the anterior communicating artery at the 21–24 mm stage of the embryo.

=== Variation ===
The anterior cerebral artery shows considerable variation. In a study made using MRA, the most common variation was an underdeveloped A1 segment (5.6%), followed by the presence of an extra A2 segment (3%). In 2% of cases there was only one A2 segment.

== Function ==
The anterior cerebral artery supplies a part of the frontal lobe, specifically its medial surface and the upper border. It also supplies the front four–fifths of the corpus callosum, and provides blood to deep structures such as the anterior limb of the internal capsule, part of the caudate nucleus, and the anterior part of the globus pallidus.

== Clinical significance ==
Areas of the brain supplied by left anterior cerebral artery (represented in green color)

=== Occlusion ===
Strokes that occur in a part of the artery prior to the anterior communicating usually do not produce many symptoms because of collateral circulation. If a blockage occurs in the A2 segment or later, the following signs and symptoms may be noted:

- Paralysis or weakness of the foot and leg on the opposite side, due to involvement of leg part of the motor cortex
- Cortical sensory loss in the opposite foot and leg
- Gait apraxia (impairment of gait and stance)
- Abulia, akinetic mutism, slowness and lack of spontaneity
- Urinary incontinence which usually occurs with bilateral damage in the acute phase
- Frontal cortical release reflexes: Contralateral grasp reflex, sucking reflex, paratonic rigidity

== Additional images ==
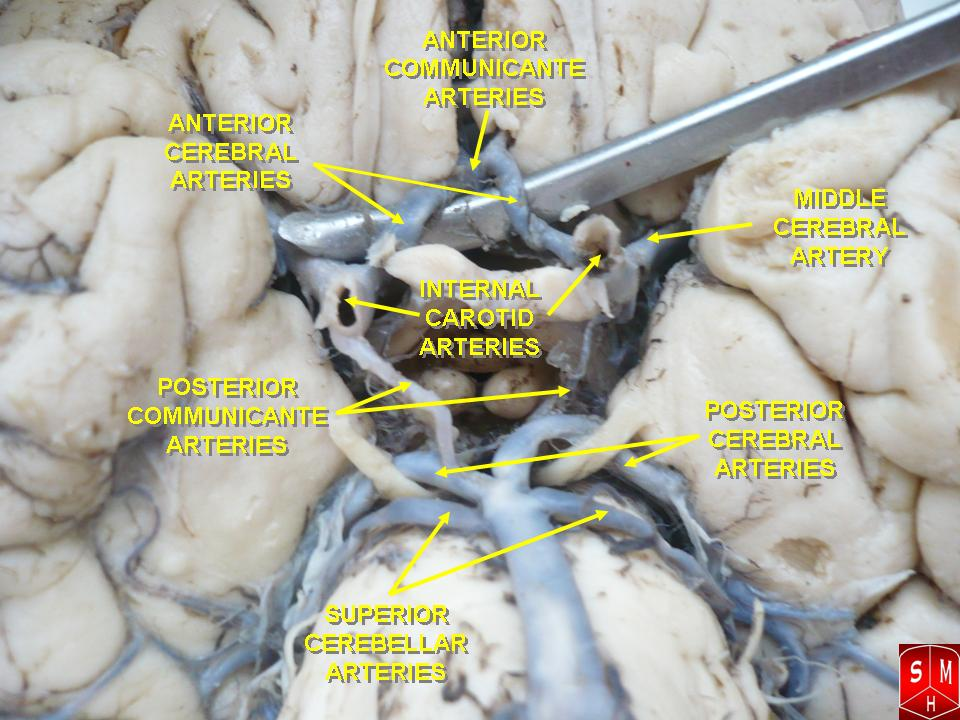
Anterior cerebral artery

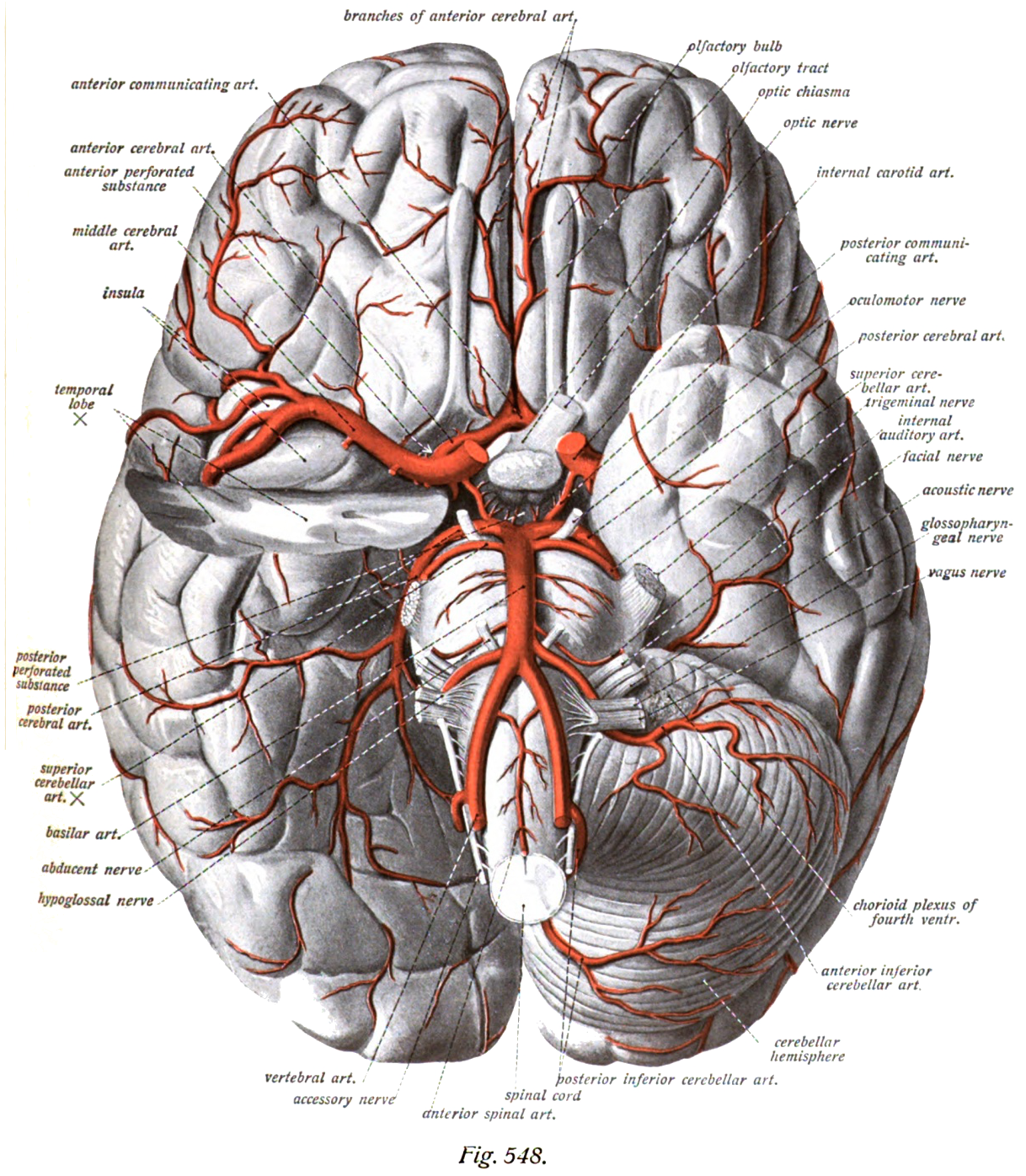
Cerebral arteries seen from beneath. Anterior cerebral artery visible at centre.

The arterial circle and arteries of the brain (inferior view). The anterior cerebral arteries (top of figure) arise from the trifurcations of the internal carotid arteries.

== See also ==
- Cerebral circulation
- Middle cerebral artery
