= Déviation conjuguée =

- Differential diagnosis: Stroke (in the middle cerebral artery)

Déviation conjuguée, also termed conjugate eye deviation (CED) or ipsilesional gaze shift, is a medical sign indicating brain damage (e.g. a stroke in the middle cerebral artery), wherein the pupils of the eye tend to move toward the side of the body where the lesion is located. The symptom was described by Swiss neurologist Jean-Louis Prévost in 1868.
