= Anterior communicating artery =

- The cerebral arterial circle and arteries of the brain (inferior view). The anterior communicating arteries (top of figure) connect the left and right anterior cerebral arteries.

Details

Identifiers
- Latin: arteria communicans anterior
- TA98: A12.2.07.029
- TA2: 4517
- FMA: 50169

In human anatomy, the anterior communicating artery is a blood vessel of the brain that connects the left and right anterior cerebral arteries.

== Anatomy ==
The anterior communicating artery connects the two anterior cerebral arteries across the commencement of the longitudinal fissure. Sometimes this vessel is wanting, the two arteries joining to form a single trunk, which afterward divides; or it may be wholly, or partially, divided into two. Its length averages about 4 mm, but varies greatly. It gives off some of the anteromedial ganglionic vessels, but these are principally derived from the anterior cerebral artery.

It is part of the cerebral arterial circle, also known as the circle of Willis.

== Physiology ==
Anatomical variations of the anterior communicating artery are relatively common. The artery is sometimes duplicated, multiplicated, fenestrated ("net-like") or very short, giving the impression that two anterior cerebral arteries are fused at the point where the anterior communicating artery is usually expected to arise.

Normally, the anterior communicating artery does not significantly contribute to cerebral blood supply, as there is negligible net blood flow within it, and some of its anteromedial branches seem to be specially adapted to ease forebrain sodium sensing, rather than to supply the brain with blood.

== Pathology ==
Aneurysms of the anterior communicating artery are the most common circle of Willis aneurysm and can cause visual field defects such as bitemporal heteronymous hemianopsia (due to compression of the optic chiasm), psychopathology and frontal lobe pathology.

In case of narrowing of other arteries of the circle of Willis or the arteries supplying the circle, the anterior communicating artery can provide a way to supply blood to the opposite (affected) side of the circle. This can often preserve the cerebral blood supply well enough to avoid the symptoms of ischemia.

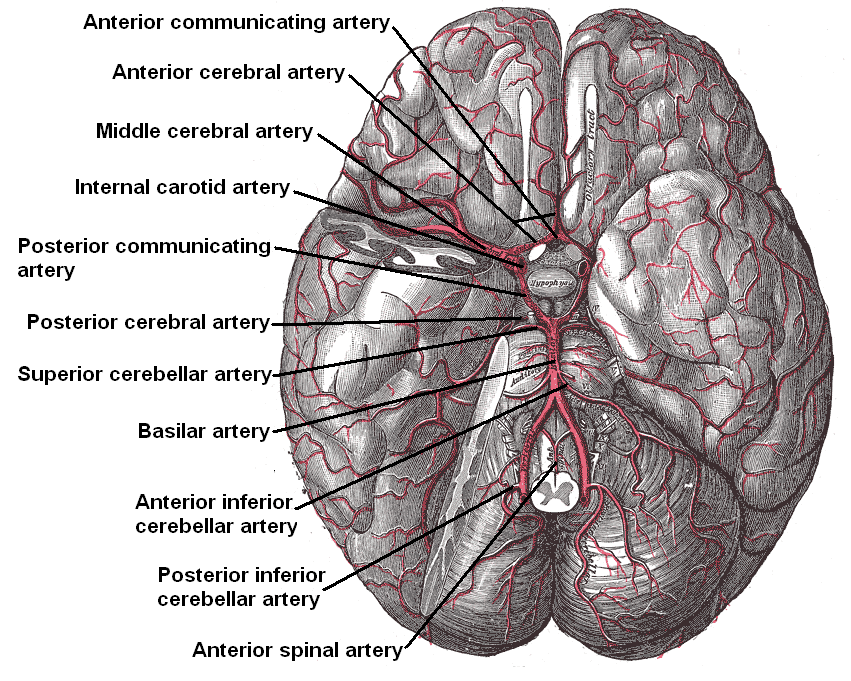
The arteries of the base of the brain. Anterior communicating artery at top. The temporal pole of the cerebrum and a portion of the cerebellar hemisphere have been removed on the right side. Inferior aspect (viewed from below).
