= Degrees of freedom problem =

Multiple ways for multi-joint objects to realize a movement

In neuroscience and motor control, the degrees of freedom problem (also known as the motor equivalence problem) describes the how there are multiple ways for the neuromuscular system to achieve a particular movement goal. Because the same task can be performed using different combinations of muscles, joints and movement trajectories, there is no simple one-to-one correspondence between a motor problem (or goal) and the motor solution used. This property is commonly described as motor redundancy.

The modern version of motor equivalence problem was first formulated by the Russian neurophysiologist Nikolai Bernstein who described the large number of degrees of freedom available in the human musculoskeletal system and the difficulty in coordinating them during movement. Bernstein writes "It is clear that the basic difficulties for co-ordination consist precisely in the extreme abundance of degrees of freedom, with which the [nervous] centre is not at first in a position to deal." These degrees of freedom exist at multiple levels: joints and muscles, trajectories of the body segments, and the neural processes and signals used to drive muscles. The human body has redundant anatomical DOFs (at muscles and joints), redundant kinematic DOFs (movements can have different trajectories, velocities, and accelerations and yet achieve the same goal), and redundant neurophysiological DOFs (multiple motoneurons synapsing on the same muscle, and vice versa). Bernstein proposed that coordinated movement depends on the organization of these interacting components, coupled by sensory feedback, rather than independent control of individual muscles, motor units, or joints. However, how and when the nervous system "chooses" a subset of these near-infinite DOFs remains an open question in motor control and motor learning.

Although motor redundancy traditionally describes the problem of constraining or selecting particular degrees of freedom (DOFs), alternative perspectives emphasize the advantages of having multiple movement solutions. The principle of motor abundance, proposes that the nervous system may exploit a multitude of motor solutions to stabilize task-relevant variables, providing a functional advantage to the mammalian and the invertebrate nervous systems. Relatedly, motor equivalence describes how different movements may still achieve the same goal. Additionally, different parts of the motor system can produce similar outcomes, a property known as degeneracy. Both illustrate the complexity of motor system as well as the flexible, adaptive nature of motor control.

Several theoretical frameworks have been developed to explain motor coordination, including optimal feedback control, the equilibrium-point hypothesis, and the uncontrolled manifold hypothesis. These approaches differ in their assumptions about how the nervous system organizes movement, but all seek to understand how coordination behavior emerges from the complex and adaptable structure of biological motor systems.

== History ==
The study of motor control historically breaks down into two broad areas: "Western" neurophysiological studies, and "Bernsteinian" functional analysis of movement. The latter has become predominant in motor control, as Bernstein's theories have held up well and are considered founding principles of the field as it exists today.

=== Pre-Bernstein ===
In the latter 19th and early 20th centuries, many scientists believed that all motor control came from the spinal cord, as experiments with stimulation in frogs displayed patterned movement ("motor primitives"), and spinalized cats were shown to be able to walk. This tradition was closely tied with the strict nervous system localizationism advocated during that period; since stimulation of the frog spinal cord in different places produced different movements, it was thought that all motor impulses were localized in the spinal cord. However, fixed structure and localizationism were slowly broken down as the central dogma of neuroscience. It is now known that the primary motor cortex and premotor cortex at the highest level are responsible for most voluntary movements. Animal models, though, remain relevant in motor control and spinal cord reflexes and central pattern generators are still a topic of study.

=== Bernstein ===
Although Lashley (1933) first formulated the motor equivalence problem, it was Bernstein who articulated the DOF problem in its current form. In Bernstein's formulation, the problem results from infinite redundancy, yet flexibility between movements; thus, the nervous system apparently must choose a particular motor solution every time it acts. In Bernstein's formulation, a single muscle never acts in isolation. Rather, large numbers of "nervous centres" cooperate in order to make a whole movement possible. Nervous impulses from different parts of the CNS may converge on the periphery in combination to produce a movement; however, there is great difficulty for scientists in understanding and coordinating the facts linking impulses to a movement. Bernstein's rational understanding of movement and prediction of motor learning via what we now call "plasticity" was revolutionary for his time.

In Bernstein's view, movements must always reflect what is contained in the "central impulse", in one way or another. However, he recognized that effectors (feed-forward) were not the only important component to movement; feedback was also necessary. Thus, Bernstein was one of the first to understand movement as a closed circle of interaction between the nervous system and the sensory environment, rather than a simple arc toward a goal. He defined motor coordination as a means for overcoming indeterminacy due to redundant peripheral DOFs. With increasing DOFs, it is increasingly necessary for the nervous system to have a more complex, delicate organizational control.

Because humans are adapted to survive, the "most important" movements tend to be reflexes -- pain or defensive reflexes needed to be carried out in very short time scales in order for ancient humans to survive their harsh environment. Most of our movements, though, are voluntary; voluntary control had historically been under-emphasized or even disregarded altogether. Bernstein saw voluntary movements as structured around a "motor problem" where the nervous system needed two factors to act: a full and complete perception of reality, as accomplished by multisensory integration, and objectivity of perception through constant and correct recognition of signals by the nervous system. Only with both may the nervous system choose an appropriate motor solution.

== Difficulties ==
The DOF problem is still a topic of study because of the complexity of the neuromuscular system of the human body. Not only is the problem itself exceedingly difficult to tackle, but the vastness of the field of study makes synthesis of theories a challenge.

=== Counting degrees of freedom ===
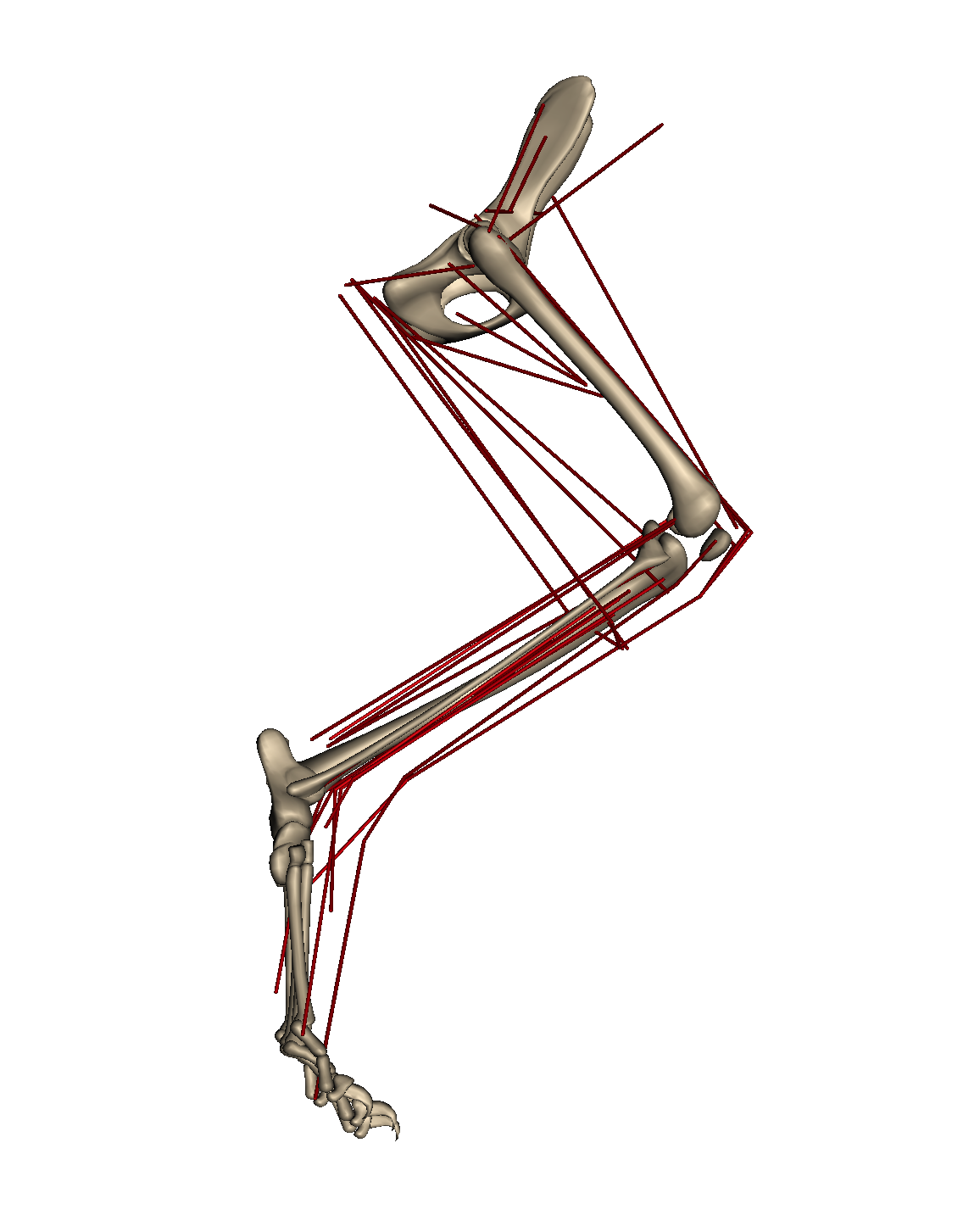
Cat hindlimb musculoskeletal model with redundant degrees of freedom at muscles (red lines) and joints

One of the largest difficulties in motor control is quantifying the exact number of DOFs in the complex neuromuscular system of the human body. In addition to having redundant muscles and joints, muscles may span multiple joints, further complicating the system. Properties of muscle change as the muscle length itself changes, making mechanical models difficult to create and understand. Individual muscles are innervated by multiple nerve fibers (motor units), and the manner in which these units are recruited is similarly complex. While each joint is commonly understood as having an agonist-antagonist pair, not all joint movement is controlled locally. Finally, movement kinematics are not identical even when performing the same motion repeatedly; natural variation in position, velocity, and acceleration of the limb occur even during seemingly identical movements.

=== Types of studies ===
Another difficulty in motor control is unifying the different ways to study movements. Three distinct areas in studying motor control have emerged: limb mechanics, neurophysiology, and motor behavior.

==== Limb mechanics ====
Studies of limb mechanics focus on the peripheral motor system as a filter which converts patterns of muscle activation into purposeful movement. In this paradigm, the building block is a motor unit (a neuron and all the muscle fibers it innervates) and complex models are built to understand the multitude of biological factors influencing motion. These models become increasingly complicated when multiple joints or environmental factors such as ground reaction forces are introduced.

==== Neurophysiology ====
In neurophysiological studies, the motor system is modeled as a distributed, often hierarchical system with the spinal cord controlling the "most automatic" of movements such as stretch reflexes, and the cortex controlling the "most voluntary" actions such as reaching for an object, with the brainstem performing a function somewhere in between the two. Such studies seek to investigate how the primary motor cortex (M1) controls planning and execution of motor tasks. Traditionally, neurophysiological studies have used animal models with electrophysiological recordings and stimulation to better understand human motor control.

==== Motor behavior ====
Studies of motor behavior focus on the adaptive and feedback properties of the nervous system in motor control. The motor system has been shown to adapt to changes in its mechanical environment on relatively short timescales while simultaneously producing smooth movements; these studies investigate how this remarkable feedback takes place. Such studies investigate which variables the nervous system controls, which variables are less tightly controlled, and how this control is implemented. Common paradigms of study include voluntary reaching tasks and perturbations of standing balance in humans.

=== Abundance or redundancy ===
Finally, the very nature of the DOF problem poses questions. For example, does the nervous system really have difficulty in choosing from DOFs, or is the abundance of DOFs necessary for evolutionary survival? In very extreme movements, humans may exhaust the limits of their DOFs—in these cases, the nervous system only has one choice. Therefore, DOFs are not always infinite. Bernstein has suggested that our vast number of DOFs allows motor learning to take place, wherein the nervous system "explores" the set of possible motor solutions before settling on an optimal solution (learning to walk and ride a bike, for example). Finally, additional DOFs allow patients with brain or spinal cord injury to often retain movement while relying on a reduced set of biomechanical DOFs. Therefore, the "degrees of freedom problem" may be a misnomer and is better understood as the "motor equivalence problem" with redundant DOFs offering an evolutionary solution to this problem.

== Hypotheses and proposed solutions ==
There have been many attempts to offer solutions or conceptual models that explain the DOF problem. One of the first hypotheses was Fitts' Law, which states that a trade-off must occur between movement speed and movement accuracy in a reaching task. Since then, many other theories have been offered.

=== Optimal control hypothesis ===
Optimal control theory provides a framework for understanding how the nervous system coordinates multiple degrees of freedom to achieve a movement goal. In this approach, motor control is modeled as a way to minimize a certain "cost" associated with a movement, subject to constraints imposed by the body (or plant), environment, and the movement. This "cost function" may be different depending on the task-goal; sometimes optimizing for movement accuracy, movement time, smoothness, effort required or energy expended. For example, minimum energy expenditure might be a task-variable associated with locomotion, while precise trajectory and positional control could be a task-variable associated with reaching for an object. Furthermore, the cost function may be quite complex (for instance, it may be a functional instead of function) and be also related to the representations in the internal space. Different cost functions and constraints may produce different movement solutions.

Optimal feedback control, initially proposed by Todorov and Jordan, emphasizes the continuous regulation of movement according to task goals and sensory information. Two key components of all optimal control systems are: a "state estimator" which tells the nervous system about what it is doing, including afferent sensory feedback and an efferent copy of the motor command; and adjustable feedback gains based on task goals. In other words, the controller uses estimates of the body's current state, informed by sensory feedback and predictions based on motor commands (see Efference copy), to adjust motor output as movements unfold.

Crucially, this approach includes the minimum intervention principle where deviations from the intended movement are corrected primarily when they interfere with task performance. For example, when reaching to grasp an object, variations in the configuration of the shoulder and elbow may be tolerable as long as the hand reaches the appropriate location to grasp the object. A deviation that interferes with the success of the grasp or position of the hand is more likely to elicit a corrective action.

For example, the speech produced by biomechanical tongue models, controlled by the internal model which minimizes the length of the path traveled in the internal space under the constraints related to the executed task (e.g., quality of speech, stiffness of tongue), was found to be quite realistic. In essence, the goal of optimal control is to "reduce degrees of freedom in a principled way." These adjustable gains might be a "minimum intervention principle" where the nervous system only performs selective error correction rather than heavily modulating the entirety of a movement.

This framework suggests that variability in movement is not necessarily eliminated; instead, it is only permitted in dimensions that are relatively unimportant for the task while feedback control stabilized task-relevant variables. As such, optimal feedback control offers an explanation for how the nervous system can exploit multiple movement solutions rather than requiring a single, invariant, movement trajectory.

==== Open and closed-loop models ====
Both open-loop and closed-loop models of optimal control have been studied; the former generally ignores the role of sensory feedback, while the latter attempts to incorporate sensory feedback, which includes delays and uncertainty associated with the sensory systems involved in movement. Open-loop models are simpler but have severe limitations—they model a movement as prerecorded in the nervous system, ignoring sensory feedback, and also fail to model variability between movements with the same task-goal. In both models, the primary difficulty is identifying the cost associated with a movement. A mix of cost variables such as minimum energy expenditure and a "smoothness" function is the most likely choice for a common performance criterion.

==== Learning and optimal control ====
Bernstein suggested that as humans learn a movement, we first reduce our DOFs by stiffening the musculature in order to have tight control, then gradually "loosen up" and explore the available DOFs as the task becomes more comfortable, and from there find an optimal solution. In terms of optimal control, it has been postulated that the nervous system can learn to find task-specific variables through an optimal control search strategy. It has been shown that adaptation in a visuomotor reaching task becomes optimally tuned so that the cost of movement trajectories decreases over trials. These results suggest that the nervous system is capable of both nonadaptive and adaptive processes of optimal control. Furthermore, these and other results suggest that rather than being a control variable, consistent movement trajectories and velocity profiles are the natural outcome of an adaptive optimal control process.

==== Limits of optimal control ====
Optimal control is a way of understanding motor control and the motor equivalence problem, but as with most mathematical theories about the nervous system, it has limitations. The theory must have certain information provided before it can make a behavioral prediction: what the costs and rewards of a movement are, what the constraints on the task are, and how state estimation takes place. In essence, the difficulty with optimal control lies in understanding how the nervous system precisely executes a control strategy. Multiple operational time-scales complicate the process, including sensory delays, muscle fatigue, changing of the external environment, and cost-learning.

=== Muscle synergy hypothesis ===
In order to reduce the number of musculoskeletal DOFs upon which the nervous system must operate, it has been proposed that the nervous system controls muscle synergies, or groups of co-activated muscles, rather than individual muscles. Specifically, a muscle synergy has been defined as "a vector specifying a pattern of relative muscle activation; absolute activation of each synergy is thought to be modulated by a single neural command signal." Multiple muscles are contained within each synergy at fixed ratios of co-activation, and multiple synergies can contain the same muscle. It has been proposed that muscle synergies emerge from an interaction between constraints and properties of the nervous and musculoskeletal systems. This organization may require less computational effort for the nervous system than individual muscle control because fewer synergies are needed to explain a behavior than individual muscles. Furthermore, it has been proposed that synergies themselves may change as behaviors are learned and/or optimized. However, synergies may also be innate to some degree, as suggested by postural responses of humans at very young ages.

A key point of the muscle synergy hypothesis is that synergies are low-dimensional and thus just a few synergies may account for a complex movement. Evidence for this structure comes from electromyographical (EMG) data in frogs, cats, and humans, where various mathematical methods such as principal components analysis and non-negative matrix factorization are used to "extract" synergies from muscle activation patterns. Similarities have been observed in synergy structure even across different tasks such as kicking, jumping, swimming and walking in frogs. Further evidence comes from stroke patients, who have been observed to use fewer synergies in certain tasks; some stroke patients used a comparable number of synergies as healthy subjects, but with reduced motor performance. These data suggest that a synergy formulation is robust and may lie at the lowest level of a hierarchical neural controller.

=== Equilibrium point hypothesis and threshold control ===
In the Equilibrium Point hypothesis, all movements are generated by the nervous system through a gradual transition of equilibrium points along a desired trajectory. "Equilibrium point" in this sense is taken to mean a state where a field has zero force, meaning opposing muscles are in a state of balance with each other, like two rubber bands pulling the joint to a stable position. Equilibrium point control is also called "threshold control" because signals sent from the CNS to the periphery are thought to modulate the threshold length of each muscle. In this theory, motor neurons send commands to muscles, which changes the force–length relation within a muscle, resulting in a shift of the system's equilibrium point. The nervous system would not need to directly estimate limb dynamics, but rather muscles and spinal reflexes would provide all the necessary information about the system's state. The equilibrium-point hypothesis is also reported to be well suited for the design of biomechanical robots controlled by appropriated internal models.

=== Force control and internal models ===
The force control hypothesis states that the nervous system uses calculation and direct specification of forces to determine movement trajectories and reduce DOFs. In this theory, the nervous system must form internal models—a representation of the body's dynamics in terms of the surrounding environment. A nervous system which controls force must generate torques based on predicted kinematics, a process called inverse dynamics. Both feed-forward (predictive) and feedback models of motion in the nervous system may play a role in this process.

=== Uncontrolled manifold (UCM) hypothesis ===
It has been noted that the nervous system controls particular variables relevant to performance of a task, while leaving other variables free to vary; this is called the uncontrolled manifold hypothesis (UCM). The uncontrolled manifold is defined as the set of variables not affecting task performance; variables perpendicular to this set in Jacobian space are considered controlled variables (CM). For example, during a sit-to-stand task, head and center-of-mass position in the horizontal plane are more tightly controlled than other variables such as hand motion. Another study indicates that the quality of tongue's movements produced by bio-robots, which are controlled by a specially designed internal model, is practically uncorrelated with the stiffness of the tongue; in other words, during the speech production the relevant parameter is the quality of speech, while the stiffness is rather irrelevant. At the same time, the strict prescription of the stiffness' level to the tongue's body affects the speech production and creates some variability, which is however, not significant for the quality of speech (at least, in the reasonable range of stiffness' levels). UCM theory makes sense in terms of Bernstein's original theory because it constrains the nervous system to only controlling variables relevant to task performance, rather than controlling individual muscles or joints.

== Unifying theories ==
Not all theories about the selection of movement are mutually exclusive. Necessarily, they all involve reduction or elimination of redundant DOFs. Optimal feedback control is related to UCM theory in the sense that the optimal control law may not act along certain dimensions (the UCM) of lesser importance to the nervous system. Furthermore, this lack of control in certain directions implies that controlled variables will be more tightly correlated; this correlation is seen in the low-dimensionality of muscle synergies. Furthermore, most of these theories incorporate some sort of feedback and feed-forward models that the nervous system must utilize. Most of these theories also incorporate some sort of hierarchical neural control scheme, usually with cortical areas at the top and peripheral outputs at the lowest level. However, none of the theories is perfect; the DOF problem will continue to be relevant as long as the nervous system is imperfectly understood.

== See also ==
- Motor control
- Motor coordination
- Motor learning
- Nikolai Bernstein
- Six degrees of freedom
