= Motor coordination =

Directed movement of body parts to accomplish an action

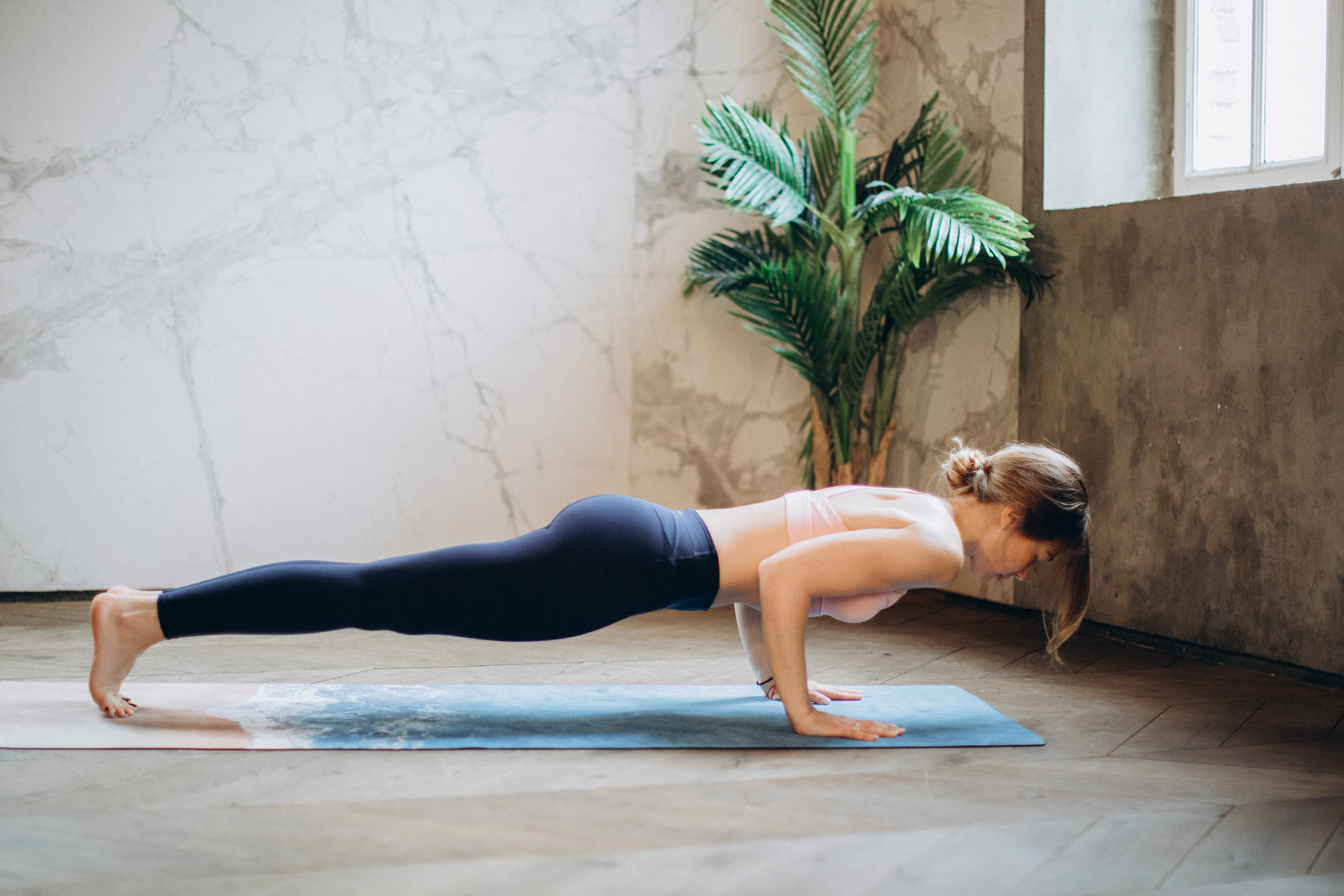
A woman exercising

In physiology, motor coordination is the orchestrated movement of multiple body parts as required to accomplish intended actions, like walking. This coordination is achieved by adjusting kinematic and kinetic parameters associated with each body part involved in the intended movement. The modifications of these parameters typically relies on sensory feedback from one or more sensory modalities (see multisensory integration), such as proprioception and vision.

== Properties ==
=== Large degrees of freedom ===
Goal-directed and coordinated movement of body parts is inherently variable because there are many ways of coordinating body parts to achieve the intended movement goal. This is because the degrees of freedom (DOF) is large for most movements due to the many associated neuro-musculoskeletal elements. Some examples of non-repeatable movements are when pointing or standing up from sitting. Actions and movements can be executed in multiple ways because synergies (as described below) can vary without changing the outcome. Early work from Nikolai Bernstein worked to understand how coordination was developed in executing a skilled movement. In this work, he remarked that there was no one-to-one relationship between the desired movement and coordination patterns to execute that movement. This equivalence suggests that any desired action does not have a particular coordination of neurons, muscles, and kinematics.

=== Complexity ===
The complexity of motor coordination goes unnoticed in everyday tasks, such as in the task of picking up and pouring a bottle of water into a glass. This seemingly simple task is actually composed of multiple complex tasks. For instance, this task requires the following:

(1) properly reaching for the water bottle and then configuring the hand in a way that enables grasping the bottle.

(2) applying the correct amount of grip force to grasp the bottle without crushing it.

(3) coordinating the muscles required for lifting and articulating the bottle so that the water can be poured into the glass.

(4) terminating the action by placing the empty bottle back on the table.

Hand-eye coordination is also required in the above task. There is simultaneous coordination between hand and eye movement as dictated by the multi-sensory integration of proprioceptive and visual information. Additional levels of coordination are required depending on if the person intends to drink from the glass, give it to someone else, or simply put it on a table.

== Types of motor coordination ==
=== Inter-limb ===
Inter-limb coordination is concerned about how movements are coordinated across limbs. In walking for instance, inter-limb coordination refers to the spatiotemporal patterns and kinematics associated with the movement of the legs. Prior work in vertebrates showed that distinct inter-limb coordination patterns, called gaits, occur at different walking speed ranges as to minimize the cost of transport. Like vertebrates, drosophila change their interleg coordination pattern in a speed-dependent manner. However, these coordination patterns follow a continuum rather than distinct gaits.

In bimanual tasks (tasks involving two hands), it was found that the functional segments of the two hands are tightly synchronized. One of the postulated theories for this functionality is the existence of a higher, "coordinating schema" that calculates the time it needs to perform each individual task and coordinates it using a feedback mechanism. There are several areas of the brain that are found to contribute to temporal coordination of the limbs needed for bimanual tasks, and these areas include the premotor cortex (PMC), the parietal cortex, the mesial motor cortices, more specifically the supplementary motor area (SMA), the cingulate motor cortex (CMC), the primary motor cortex (M1), and the cerebellum.

Several studies have proposed that inter-limb coordination can be modeled by coupled phase oscillators, a key component of a central pattern generator (CPG) control architecture. In this framework, the coordination between limbs is dictated by the relative phase of the oscillators representing the limbs. Specifically, an oscillator associated with a particular limb determines the progression of that limb through its movement cycle (e.g. step cycle in walking). In addition to driving the relative limb movement in a forward manner, sensory feedback can be incorporated into the CPG architecture. This feedback also dictates the coordination between the limbs by independently modifying the movement of the limb that the feedback is acting on.

=== Intra-limb ===
Intra-limb coordination involves orchestrating the movement of the limb segments that make up a single limb. This coordination can be achieved by controlling/restricting the joint trajectories and/or torques of each limb segment as required to achieve the overall desired limb movement, as demonstrated by the joint-space model. Alternatively, intra-limb coordination can be accomplished by just controlling the trajectory of an end-effector, such as a hand. An example of such concept is the minimum-jerk model proposed by Neville Hogan and Tamar Flash, which suggests that the parameter the nervous system controls is the spatial path of the hand, ensuring that it is maximally smooth. Francesco Lacquaniti, Carlo Terzuolo and Paolo Viviani showed that the angular velocity of a pen's tip varies with the two-thirds power of the path curvature (two-thirds power law) during drawing and handwriting. The two-thirds power law is compatible with the minimum-jerk model, but also with central pattern generators. It has subsequently been shown that the central nervous system is devoted to its coding. Importantly, control strategies for goal directed movement are task-dependent. This was shown by testing two different conditions: (1) subjects moved cursor in the hand to the target and (2) subjects move their free hand to the target. Each condition showed different trajectories: (1) straight path and (2) curved path.

=== Eye-hand ===
Eye–hand coordination is associated with how eye movements are coordinated with and influence hand movements. Prior work implicated eye movement in the motor planning of goal-directed hand movement.

== Learning of coordination patterns ==
The following pages are recommended for understanding how coordination patterns are learned or adapted:

- Motor learning
- Motor adaptation
- Motor control, Internal model, and sensory-motor coupling

== Related theories of motor coordination ==
=== Muscle synergies ===
Nikolai Bernstein proposed the existence of muscle synergies as a neural strategy of simplifying the control of multiple degrees of freedom. A functional muscle synergy is defined as a pattern of co-activation of muscles recruited by a single neural command signal. One muscle can be part of multiple muscle synergies, and one synergy can activate multiple muscles. Synergies are learned, rather than being hardwired, like motor programs, and are organized in a task-dependent manner. In other words, it is likely that a synergy is structured for a particular action and not for the possible activation levels of the components themselves. Work from Emilio Bizzi suggests that sensory feedback adapts synergies to fit behavioral constraints, but may differ in an experience-dependent manner. Synergies allow the components for a particular task to be controlled with a single signal, rather than independently. As the muscles of limb controlling movement are linked, it is likely that the error and variability are also shared, providing flexibility and compensating for errors in the individual motor components. The current method of finding muscle synergies is to use statistical and/or coherence analyses on measured EMG (electromyography) signals of different muscles during movements. A reduced number of control elements (muscle synergies) are combined to form a continuum of muscle activation for smooth motor control during various tasks. Directionality of a movement has an effect on how the motor task is performed (i.e. walking forward vs. walking backward, each uses different levels of contraction in different muscles). Moreover, it is thought that the muscle synergies limited the number of degrees of freedom by constraining the movements of certain joints or muscles (flexion and extension synergies). However, the biological reason for muscle synergies is debated. In addition to the understanding of muscle coordination, muscle synergies have also been instrumental in assessing motor impairments, helping to identify deviations in typical movement patterns and underlying neurological disorders.

=== Uncontrolled manifold hypothesis ===
Another hypothesis proposes that the central nervous system does not eliminate the redundant degrees of freedom, but instead uses them to ensure flexible and stable performance of motor tasks at the cost of motor variability. The Uncontrolled Manifold (UCM) Hypothesis provides a way to quantify a "muscle synergy" in this framework. This hypothesis defines "synergy" a little differently from that stated above; a synergy represents an organization of elemental variables (degrees of freedom) that stabilizes an important performance variable. Elemental variable is the smallest sensible variable that can be used to describe a system of interest at a selected level of analysis, and a performance variable refers to the potentially important variables produced by the system as a whole. For example, in a multi-joint reaching task, the angles and the positions of certain joints are the elemental variables, and the performance variables are the endpoint coordinates of the hand.

This hypothesis proposes that the controller (the brain) acts in the space of elemental variables (i.e. the rotations shared by the shoulder, elbow, and wrist in arm movements) and selects the feasible manifolds (i.e. sets of angular values corresponding to a final position). This hypothesis acknowledges that variability is always present in movement, and it categorizes it into two types: (1) bad variability and (2) good variability. Bad variability affects the important performance variable and causes large errors in the result of a motor task, and good variability keeps the performance task unchanged and leads to a successful outcome. An interesting example of the good variability was observed in the movements of the tongue, which are responsible for the speech production. The stiffness level to the tongue's body creates some variability (in terms of the acoustical parameters of speech, such as formants), but this variability does not impair the quality of speech. One of the possible explanations might be that the brain only works to decrease the bad variability that hinders the desired result, and it does so by increasing the good variability in the redundant domain.

== See also ==
- Perceptual control theory
- Developmental coordination disorder
- Sensory processing
