= Ivaldi =

Ivaldi is a surname of Italian origin. Notable people with this surname include:

- Christian Ivaldi (born 1938), French pianist
- Ettore Ivaldi, Italian former slalom canoeist
- Francesco Ivaldi (born 1977), Italian yacht racer who competed in the 2000 Summer Olympics
- Humberto Ivaldi (1909–1947), Panamanian painter and director of the National School of Painting in Panama City
- Matteo Ivaldi (born 1971) is an Italian yacht racer who competed in the 1996 and in the 2000 Summer Olympics
- Michele Ivaldi (born 1970), Italian yacht racer who competed in the 1996 Summer Olympics
- Mickaël Ivaldi (born 1990), French Rugby Union player
- Raffaello Ivaldi (born 1997), Italian slalom canoeist
- Ferdinando "Sandro" Mussa-Ivaldi, Italian born professor at Northwestern University
- Serena Ivaldi Italian-born robotics researcher
