= Bizzi =

Bizzi is an Italian surname. Notable people with the surname include:

- Emilio Bizzi (born 1933), Italian neuroscientist
- Marino Bizzi (1565–1625), Archbishop of Bar
- Olimpio Bizzi (1916–1976), Italian cyclist
- Rikard Bizzi (born 1985), Swedish musician
