= John Krakauer =

American neurologist and neuroscientist

John W. Krakauer
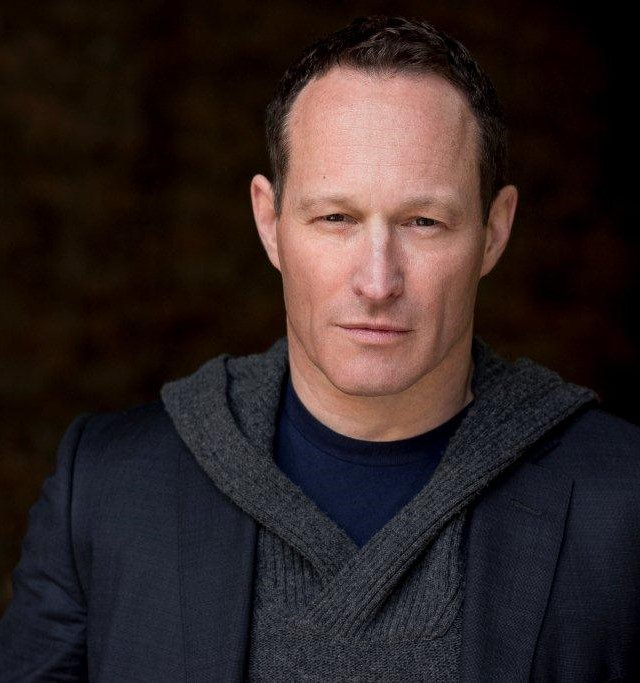
- Krakauer in 2015
- Education: Trinity College, Cambridge; Columbia University College of Physicians and Surgeons
- Known for: Motor control and motor learning in stroke and stroke recovery
- Relatives: David Krakauer (brother)
- Scientific career
- Fields: Neurology; neuroscience
- Workplaces: Champalimaud Foundation; Johns Hopkins University
- Academic advisors: Claude Ghez; Eric Kandel

John Krakauer is an American neurologist and neuroscientist. He is the director of the Centre for Restorative Neurotechnology at the Champalimaud Foundation in Lisbon, Portugal, and John C. Malone Professor of Neurology, Neuroscience, and Physical Medicine and Rehabilitation at Johns Hopkins University in Baltimore, Maryland. He is a co-founder of the KATA project at the Johns Hopkins School of Medicine and head of Vision for MindMaze. His areas of interest range from motor learning, motor control, and stroke to bioethics. From 2003 until 2010, he was the codirector of the Motor Performance Laboratory at the Neurological Institute of Columbia University.

Krakauer received his bachelor's degree at Trinity College of Cambridge University. He completed the Osler internship at Johns Hopkins University and both his neurology residency and neurovascular fellowship at Columbia University.

He joined the faculty of Johns Hopkins in 2010. Since 2014, he has been the founder and director of the Brain, Learning, Animation, and Movement (BLAM) Lab. There, he also cofounded the Kata project, with computer scientist Omar Ahmad, and advocated for the development of an interactive video game, Bandit's Shark Showdown, to help rehabilitate stroke patients, which was later released as an app.

He joined the external faculty of the Santa Fe Institute in 2019. In 2026, he was named director of the Centre for Restorative Neurotechnology at the Champalimaud Foundation in Lisbon.

== Selected publications ==
- Krakauer JW, Mazzoni P (2011). "Human sensorimotor learning: adaptation, skill, and beyond" (PDF). Current Opinion in Neurobiology. 21 (4): 636–644. doi:10.1016/j.conb.2011.06.012. PMID 21764294. S2CID 8558720.
- Zarahn E, Alon L, Ryan SL, Lazar RM, Vry MS, Weiller C, Marshall RS, Krakauer JW (2011). "Prediction of Motor Recovery Using Initial Impairment and fMRI 48 h Poststroke" (PDF). Cerebral Cortex. 21 (12): 2712–2721. doi:10.1093/cercor/bhr047. PMC 3209795. PMID 21527788.
- Huang VS, Haith A, Mazzoni P, Krakauer JW (2011). "Rethinking motor learning and savings in adaptation paradigms: model-free memory for successful actions combines with internal models" (PDF). Neuron. 70 (4): 787–801. doi:10.1016/j.neuron.2011.04.012. PMC 3134523. PMID 21609832.
- Shadmehr R, Smith MA, Krakauer JW (2010). "Error correction, sensory prediction, and adaptation in motor control" (PDF). Annual Review of Neuroscience. 33: 89–108. doi:10.1146/annurev-neuro-060909-153135. PMID 20367317. S2CID 147307.
