= Andrew G. Alleyne =

American academic

- Education: Princeton University; University of California, Berkeley
- Awards: ASME Thurston Lecture Award (2020)
- Scientific career
- Workplaces: University of Minnesota; University of Illinois at Urbana–Champaign; Delft University of Technology; University of Colorado at Boulder; ETH Zurich; Johannes Kepler University
- Doctoral students: Kira Barton

Andrew G. Alleyne is an American mechanical engineer who is the Dean of the College of Science and Engineering at the University of Minnesota.

== Early life and education ==
Alleyne was appointed to the faculty of the Mechanical and Industrial Engineering department at University of Illinois Urbana-Champaign in 1994.

== Career ==
Alleyne held a visiting position as a Fulbright scholar at the Delft University of Technology. In 2008 he was appointed Associate Dean for Research in the College of Engineering at the University of Illinois, Urbana-Champaign.

Alleyne works on the dynamic modeling and simulation of complex systems as well as the development of algorithms for decision making for complex system.

Alleyne has contributed to advances in Iterative Learning Control (ILC). For experimental systems, he has developed the platform and process control for electro-hydrodynamic jet printing; which allows for the precise printing of wide variety materials. He has also created ways to dynamically monitor and control thermal management systems for power electronics, which are used in planes, ships and cars. Alleyne worked with the Air Force Research Laboratory to create the Aircraft Transient Thermal Modeling and Optimization toolbox.

=== Awards and honors ===
- 2008 American Society of Mechanical Engineers Gustus L. Larson Memorial Award
- 2012 Air Force Meritorious Civilian Service Award
- 2014 American Society of Mechanical Engineers Henry M. Paynter Outstanding Investigator Award
- 2018 American Automatic Control Council Control Engineering Practice Award
- 2019 University of Illinois at Urbana–Champaign Innovation Transfer Award

=== Academic service ===
Alleyne has worked to improve inclusivity and gender balance within science and engineering. Since becoming professor in 2004 Alleyne has served on several recruitment committees and transformed the MechSE faculty to 25% women. In 2017 he was awarded the Society of Women Engineers Advocating Women in Engineering Award in recognition of his commitment to gender equality.

His efforts toward teaching and mentoring diversity was recognized by the UIUC Larine Y. Cowan "Make a Difference" award in 2014. In 2016 he was awarded the University of Illinois at Urbana–Champaign Outstanding Advisor Award. For educational contributions outside of UIUC, he was presented with the American Society of Mechanical Engineers Yasundo Takahashi Education Award in 2017 for his contributions to education relevant to the Dynamic Systems and Control Division.

Alleyne was named as the new Dean of the College of Science and Engineering at the University of Minnesota in September 2021. He assumed the role January 10, 2022.

=== Publications ===
- Alleyne, Andrew G. (2006-05-30). "A survey of iterative learning control". IEEE Control Systems Magazine. 26 (3): 96–114. doi:10.1109/MCS.2006.1636313. S2CID 45807426.
- Alleyne, Andrew G. (2007). "High-resolution electrohydrodynamic jet printing". Nature Medicine. 6 (10): 782–789. Bibcode:2007NatMa...6..782P. doi:10.1038/nmat1974. PMID 17676047. S2CID 29661877.
- Alleyne, Andrew G. (1995). "Nonlinear adaptive control of active suspensions". IEEE Transactions on Control Systems Technology. 3: 94–101. doi:10.1109/87.370714.

== Personal life ==
Alleyne is married to Marianne Alleyne, an entomology professor at University of Illinois at Urbana–Champaign, with whom he has two children.
