= Repetitive control =

Repetitive Control is a control method developed by a group of Japanese scholars in 1980s. It is based on the Internal Model Principle and used specifically in dealing with periodic signals, for example, tracking periodic reference or rejecting periodic disturbances. The repetitive control system has been proven to be a very effective and practical method dealing with periodic signals. Repetitive control has some similarities with iterative learning control. The differences between these two methods can be found in [Wang, Gao, and Doyle. 2009].
