= Randy Flanagan =

Canadian neuroscientist

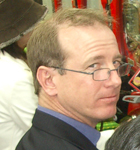
- Born: John Randall Flanagan; 8 January 1960 (age 66)
- Citizenship: Canada
- Education: McGill University (MA); University of Alberta (BPE)
- Spouse: Françoise Mathieu
- Scientific career
- Fields: Neuroscience
- Workplaces: Queen's University; Teachers College, Columbia University
- Thesis: Measurement and Modelling of Human Target-Directed Reaching Movements (1992)
- Doctoral advisor: David Ostry
- Website: www.flanaganlab.com

John Randall "Randy" Flanagan (born 8 January 1960) is a Canadian neuroscientist, who has made important contributions to the neuroscience of sensorimotor control. From 2006 he has been a professor of psychology at Queen's University.

== Education ==
Flanagan completed a B.P.E. in Physical Education at the University of Alberta in 1983 and an MA in Physical Education at McGill University, where he also completed a PhD in Psychology in 1992 with David Ostry.

== Career ==
Flanagan pursued psychology as a postdoctoral researcher (1992–1994) at the MRC Applied Psychology Unit in Cambridge with Alan Wing. He then joined the faculty of Teachers College, Columbia University in 1994 before moving to the Department of Psychology at Queen's University in 1995.
