= Tamar Flash =

Israeli neuroscientist and control theorist

Tamar Flash (Hebrew: תמר פלאש) is an Israeli neuroscientist and control theorist whose research concerns biological motor control, including the motion of the human arm, the effects of neurological damage on motion, and the use of robotics to study biological motion. She holds the Dr. Hymie Moross Professorial Chair in the Faculty of Mathematics and Computer Science at the Weizmann Institute of Science.

== Education and career ==
Flash is originally from Ramat Gan. She studied physics at Tel Aviv University, graduating in 1972, and earned a master's degree there in 1976. Beginning in 1978, she studied medical physics and medical engineering at the Massachusetts Institute of Technology (MIT); she completed her Ph.D. there in 1983.

After postdoctoral research at MIT, she joined the Weizmann Institute of Science in 1985. There, she held the Corinne S. Koshland Career Development Chair from 1987 to 1991. She was promoted to associate professor in 1991 and to full professor in 1998, and was given the Hymie Moross Professorial Chair in 2003. She chaired the Department of Computer Science and Applied Mathematics from 2004 to 2006.

== Recognition ==
Flash was elected to the International Neuropsychological Society in 1994. She was named as an international honorary member of the American Academy of Arts and Sciences in 2016.
