= Kira Barton =

American mechanical engineer

Kira L. Barton is an American mechanical engineer whose research concerns the applications of control theory to the coordination of multi-agent and autonomous robot systems, including in additive manufacturing. Her work has also involved the development of a digital twin framework for smart manufacturing. She is a professor of mechanical engineering, professor of robots, and Miller Faculty Scholar at the University of Michigan.

== Education and career ==
She graduated from the University of Colorado Boulder in 2001 where she majored in mechanical engineering. She continued her studies at the University of Illinois Urbana-Champaign, where she received a master's degree in 2006 and completed her Ph.D. in 2010, under the supervision of Andrew G. Alleyne.

She joined the University of Michigan as an assistant professor of mechanical engineering in 2011.She is currently a professor in the robotics and mechanical department of the University of Michigan. She is the associate director of the automotive research center, which is a center that specializes in the modeling and simulation of civilian and military ground systems.

== Recognition and Awards ==
- Barton was a 2015 recipient of the Society of Manufacturing Engineers Outstanding Young Manufacturing Engineer Award, and in 2015 became the inaugural recipient of the Outstanding Young Alumni Award of the University of Illinois Urbana-Champaign Department of Mechanical Science and Engineering. She was the 2017 recipient of the biennial Outstanding Young Investigator Award of the American Society of Mechanical Engineers (ASME) Dynamic Systems & Control Division.
- She was named as an ASME Fellow in 2024.
- AY23-24 MMRI UM Faculty Proposal Team Awards, for the project:Generative AI for Materials and 3D Printing Co-Design: Toward a Center for Additive Manufacturing and Material Advancements in Construction (CAMMAC), in collaboration with Dr. Mania Aghaei Meibodi. Presented by the Michigan Materials Research Institute (MMRI), University of Michigan (UM).
