= Mania Aghaei Meibodi =

Dr Mania Aghaei Meibodi
- Occupations: Architect, Researcher, Assistant Professor
- Employer: University of Michigan
- Known for: 3D-printed formwork, computational design, digital fabrication

Mania Aghaei Meibodi is an architect, researcher and academic whose work focuses on digital fabrication, computational design, and large-scale 3D printing in architecture. She is an Assistant Professor at the Taubman College of Architecture and Urban Planning, University of Michigan, in Ann Arbor, United States, and director of the DART Laboratory.

== Early life and education ==
Aghaei Meibodi earned a Master's degree in Architecture and a PhD in Architectural Technology from the KTH Royal Institute of Technology in Stockholm, Sweden. She also obtained a Licentiate of Engineering from Luleå University of Technology.

== Career ==
After completing her doctoral studies, Aghaei Meibodi joined the Public Research University ETH Zurich as a postdoctoral researcher in the Digital Building Technologies(DBT) of Zurich. She worked on several major research projects, including:

- Smart Slab – the first full-scale architectural project using 3D-printed sand formwork for concrete.
- Deep Façade – employing binder-jet 3D-printed sand molds for casting bespoke metal façade elements.

She joined the University of Michigan, as an Assistant Professor and director of the DART (Digital Architecture Research & Technologies) Lab.

== Research ==
Her research focuses on:

- Additive manufacturing for architecture
- Computational geometry and generative design
- Robotic and data-driven construction
- Sustainable building components and advanced formwork systems

== Awards and recognition ==
- NSF CAREER Award (2025) for research on data-driven robotic 3D printing of reinforced concrete.
- U-M Innovation Champion (2025), recognized by the University of Michigan for leadership in research commercialization.
- Bold Challenges Award (2024), presented by the University of Michigan to support interdisciplinary research addressing global challenges.
- AY23-24 MMRI UM Faculty Proposal Team Awards for the project:Generative AI for Materials and 3D Printing Co-Design: Toward a Center for Additive Manufacturing and Material Advancements in Construction (CAMMAC), in collaboration with Prof. Kira Barton (Robotics Engineering). Presented by the Michigan Materials Research Institute (MMRI), University of Michigan (UM).
- Selected as a 2022 Construction Institute Visionary by the Construction Institute of the Taubman College of Architecture and Urban Planning, University of Michigan.

== Selected publications ==
- "3D-Printed Stay-in-Place Formwork for Topologically Optimized Concrete Slabs." (TxA Emerging Design + Technology, San Antonio, US, 2016).
- "Complex architectural elements from HPFRC and 3D printed sandstone" (RILEM Symposium on Ultra-High Performance Fibre-Reinforced Concrete, Montpellier, France, 2017).
- "The Smart Takes from the Strong: 3D Printing Stay-in-Place Formwork for Concrete Slab Construction" (Fabricate, University of Stuttgart, Germany, 2017).
- "3D-Printed Formwork for Prefabricated Concrete Slabs" (1^{st} International Conference on 3D Construction Printing Swinburne University of Technology, Melbourne, Australia, 2018).
- "3D Printing Sand Molds for Casting Bespoke Metal Connections" (24^{th} International Conference of the Association for CAADRIA Computer-Aided Architectural Design Research in Asia, Faculty of Architecture & Design, Victoria University of Wellington, New Zealand, 2019).
- "Bespoke Cast Façade" (ACADIA, Florida International University, Miami, US, 2019).
- "Towards Lightweight Structure: Coupling Topology Optimization with Non-planar 3D Concrete Printing" (Symbiotic Intelligence CDRF 2024, Singapore, 2025).
- "Hybrid Approaches Towards 3D Concrete Printing for Lightweight Reinforced Concrete Structures" (Digital Concrete 2024, Eindhoven, Netherlands, 2024).
- "Techniques and Strategies in Extrusion-Based 3D Concrete Printing of Complex Components to Prevent Premature Failure" (Automation in Construction, Elsevier, 2024).
- "BioMatters: The Robotic 3D-Printed Biodegradable Wood-Based Formwork for Cast-in-Place Concrete Structures" (DART Lab, Taubman College of Architecture and Urban Planning, University of Michigan, US, 2025).
