= RunBot =

Miniature bipedal robot

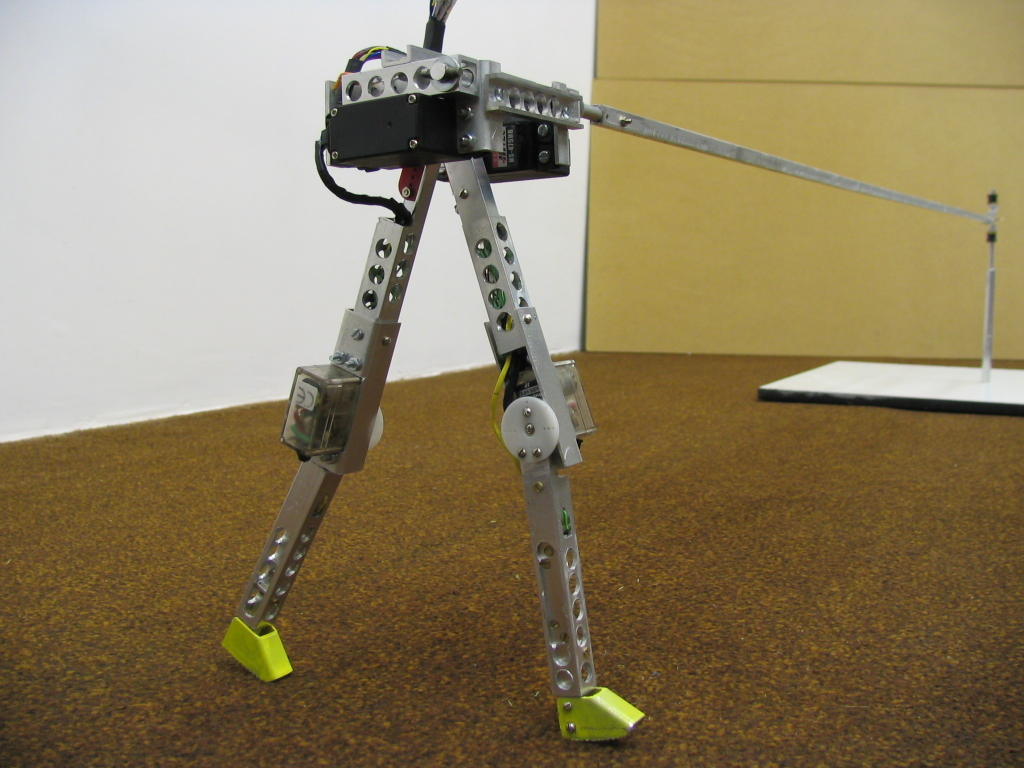
RunBot

RunBot is a miniature bipedal robot which belongs to the class of limit cycle walkers. Instead of using a central pattern generator it uses reflexes which generate the gait. The reflexes are triggered by ground contact sensors in the feet which then activate the motors. The generation of the walking gait is straightforward: when a foot touches the ground the other leg is lifted upwards so that the robot falls forward. This then causes this leg to touch the ground and so forth. The walking speed can be improved by means of reinforcement learning because there are only a few parameters in this scheme. RunBot was built in 2005 by Tao Geng as part of his PhD under supervision of Prof Woergoetter and after an idea by Dr Porr to use a walking robot to benchmark reflex based reinforcement learning rules. Its movements and adaptability are based on the work of neurophysiologist Nikolai Bernstein.

Since its inception the RunBot has undergone numerous design iterations, for example where a moveable upper body mass on the robot keeps the walking pattern stable even on uneven terrain.

== Design ==
The locomotion system is kept simple with four motors: one on each of two knees, one on each of two hips. The sensory system is of similar simplicity, with the ability to detect the ground contact and the angles of the hips/knee motors. The motors are controlled by force and not by angle.
