= Kurt Thoroughman =

Kurt A. Thoroughman
- Born: January 31, 1972 (age 54); Kalamazoo, MI
- Education: University of Chicago
- Known for: Trial-by-Trial Approach to Motor Learning
- Scientific career
- Fields: Computational Neuroscience, Motor Control
- Workplaces: Washington University; Brandeis University; Johns Hopkins University; University of Chicago

Kurt A. Thoroughman (born 31 January 1972) is an Associate Professor in the Department of Biomedical Engineering at Washington University in St. Louis. He is known for his work in the study of motor control, motor learning, and computational neuroscience.

Thoroughman investigates how humans plan, control, and learn new movements. Understanding normal motor behavior and its neural basis will further the development of clinical tests in movement neurology, and facilitate the early detection and treatment of motor diseases.

Thoroughman graduated with a PhD in Biomedical Engineering from Johns Hopkins University in 1999, completing a thesis in the Laboratory of Computational Motor Control, under the mentorship of Reza Shadmehr. After completion of his PhD, Thoroughman was a postdoctoral fellow with Eve Marder at Brandeis University.

== Selected publications ==
Taylor JA, Thoroughman KA (Jun 2008). Robertson, Edwin (ed.). "Motor adaptation scaled by the difficulty of a secondary cognitive task". PLOS ONE. 3 (6) e2485. Bibcode:2008PLoSO...3.2485T. doi:10.1371/journal.pone.0002485. PMC 2413425. PMID 18560546.

Fine MS, Thoroughman KA (Sep 2007). "Trial-by-trial transformation of error into sensorimotor adaptation changes with environmental dynamics". J. Neurophysiol. 98 (3): 1392–404. doi:10.1152/jn.00196.2007. PMID 17615136.

Thoroughman KA, Wang W, Tomov DN (Aug 2007). "Influence of viscous loads on motor planning". J. Neurophysiol. 98 (2): 870–7. CiteSeerX 10.1.1.120.4936. doi:10.1152/jn.01126.2006. PMID 17522176.

Taylor JA, Thoroughman KA (Jul 2007). "Divided attention impairs human motor adaptation but not feedback control". J. Neurophysiol. 98 (1): 317–26. doi:10.1152/jn.01070.2006. PMID 17460104. S2CID 1944853.

Fine MS, Thoroughman KA (Aug 2006). "Motor adaptation to single force pulses: sensitive to direction but insensitive to within-movement pulse placement and magnitude". J. Neurophysiol. 96 (2): 710–20. CiteSeerX 10.1.1.134.5541. doi:10.1152/jn.00215.2006. PMID 16707722.

Thoroughman KA, Taylor JA (Sep 2005). "Rapid reshaping of human motor generalization". J. Neurosci. 25 (39): 8948–53. doi:10.1523/JNEUROSCI.1771-05.2005. PMC 6725605. PMID 16192385.

Thoroughman KA (Mar 2004). "Flexible control of flexible objects. Focus on "An experimentally confirmed mathematical model for human control of a non-rigid object"". J. Neurophysiol. 91 (3): 1109–10. doi:10.1152/jn.01060.2003. PMID 14973324.

Soto-Treviño C, Thoroughman KA, Marder E, Abbott LF (Mar 2001). "Activity-dependent modification of inhibitory synapses in models of rhythmic neural networks". Nat. Neurosci. 4 (3): 297–303. doi:10.1038/85147. PMID 11224547. S2CID 2745956.

Thoroughman KA, Shadmehr R (Oct 2000). "Learning of action through adaptive combination of motor primitives". Nature. 407 (6805): 742–7. Bibcode:2000Natur.407..742T. doi:10.1038/35037588. PMC 2556237. PMID 11048720.

Thoroughman KA, Shadmehr R (Oct 1999). "Electromyographic correlates of learning an internal model of reaching movements". J. Neurosci. 19 (19): 8573–88. doi:10.1523/JNEUROSCI.19-19-08573.1999. PMC 6783008. PMID 10493757.
