= Francesco Lacquaniti =

Italian neuroscientist

- Born: 24 December 1952 (age 73); Turin, Italy
- Education: University of Turin (MD) – 1976; University of Turin (Specialty in Neurology) - 1980
- Known for: Motor coordination
- Awards: National Research Council (Italy) Gradoni Prize (1985); Ig Nobel Prize (2013); Herlitzka International Prize for Physiology (2015); Elected to Academia Europaea (2012); Elected to Consiglio Universitario Nazionale (2015); Doctor Honoris Causa Université catholique de Louvain (2020)
- Scientific career
- Fields: Neuroscience
- Workplaces: University of Turin; University of Minnesota Medical School; National Research Council (Italy); University of Cagliari; University of Rome Tor Vergata

Francesco Lacquaniti is an Italian neurologist and neuroscientist. He received his medical education and completed his Neurology residency at the University of Turin. He is professor emeritus of Physiology at the University of Rome Tor Vergata, the Director of the Laboratory of Neuromotor Physiology at Santa Lucia Foundation IRCCS Rome, and the President of the Italian Physiological Society. His research focuses on the laws of movement control in humans and other animals (including the two-thirds Power law, see Penmanship, Motor coordination, Affine curvature) and their development in children and alteration after neurological lesions (Developmental coordination disorder, Central facial palsy). He also studied the neural representation of spatial information in the brain (Brodmann area 5), the neural representation of gravity effects on the body (Mental model, Internal model (motor control)), and how the brain adapts to weightlessness (Locomotion in space). His studies have inspired the development of innovative neurorehabilitation protocols for patients with motor disorders (e.g.). His scientific work has been covered in books and media. For his work, he received the Herlitzka International Prize for Physiology, was elected to the Consiglio Universitario Nazionale, was elected to the Academia Europaea, and received an Honorary Degree in Neurosciences from the Université Catholique de Louvain.

== Selected publications ==
- Dominici N, et al. (2011). "Locomotor primitives in newborn babies and their development". Science. 334 (6058): 997–999. Bibcode:2011Sci...334..997D. doi:10.1126/science.1210617. PMID 22096202. S2CID 206536191.
- Sylos-Labini F, et al. (2020). "Distinct locomotor precursors in newborn babies". Proceedings of the National Academy of Sciences of the United States of America. 117 (17): 9604–9612. Bibcode:2020PNAS..117.9604S. doi:10.1073/pnas.1920984117. PMC 7196819. PMID 32284405. S2CID 215759798.
- Lacquaniti F, Ivanenko YP, Zago M (2012). "Development of human locomotion". Current Opinion in Neurobiology. 22 (5): 822–828. doi:10.1016/j.conb.2012.03.012. hdl:2108/62727. PMID 22498713. S2CID 10288398.
- McIntyre J, Zago M, Berthoz A, Lacquaniti F (2001). "Does the brain model Newton's laws?". Nature Neuroscience. 4 (7): 693–694. doi:10.1038/89477. PMID 11426224. S2CID 30444364.
- Indovina I, et al. (2005). "Representation of visual gravitational motion in the human vestibular cortex". Science. 308 (5720): 416–419. Bibcode:2005Sci...308..416I. doi:10.1126/science.1107961. hdl:2108/19501. PMID 15831760. S2CID 22179461.
