= David Ostry =

Engineer and neuroscientist

David J. Ostry is an engineer and neuroscientist whose research focuses on human motor control.

Ostry is a professor of psychology at McGill University and a senior scientist at Haskins Laboratories in New Haven, Connecticut. His research focuses on understanding the biological mechanisms of voluntary movement and deals equally with speech production and human arm motion. He uses mathematical models, robots and behavioral and physiological techniques to assess motor function and the characteristics of motor learning. The overall goals of his work have been to understand the interplay of sensory and motor function and most recently, to understand how motor learning and adaptation affects sensory function in speech and limb movement.

== Representative publications ==
- Ostry, D. J., Gribble, P. L. and Gracco, V. L. (1996). Coarticulation of jaw movements in speech production: Is context sensitivity in speech kinematics centrally planned? The Journal of Neuroscience, 16(4), 1570–1579.
- Gribble, P.L. and Ostry, D.J. (1996) Origins of the power law relation between movement velocity and curvature: Modeling the effects of muscle mechanics and limb dynamics. Journal of Neurophysiology, 76, 2853–2860.
- Laboissière, R., Ostry, D.J. and Feldman, A.G. (1996) The control of multi-muscle systems: Human jaw and hyoid movements. Biological Cybernetics, 74, 373–384.
- Gribble P.L., Ostry D.J., Sanguineti V. and Laboissière R. (1998). Are complex control signals required for human arm movement? Journal of Neurophysiology, 79: 1409–1424.
- Gribble, P.L. and Ostry, D.J. (1999) Compensation for interaction torques during single and multi-joint limb movements. Journal of Neurophysiology, 82, 2310–2326.
- Gribble P.L. and Ostry D.J. (2000). Compensation for loads during arm movements using equilibrium-point control. Experimental Brain Research, 135: 474–82.
- Petitto L.A., Holowka S, Sergio L.E. and Ostry D.J. (2001). Language rhythms in baby hand movements. Nature, 413: 35–6.
- Tremblay S., Shiller D.M. and Ostry D.J. (2003). Somatosensory basis of speech production. Nature, 423: 866–869.
- Ostry D.J. and Feldman A.G. (2003). A critical evaluation of the force control hypothesis in motor control. Experimental Brain Research, 221: 275–288.
- Malfait N. and Ostry D.J. (2004). Is interlimb transfer of force-field adaptation a "cognitive" response to the sudden introduction of load? Journal of Neuroscience, 24: 8084–8089.
- Mattar A.A.G. and Ostry D.J. (2007) Modifiability of generalization in dynamics learning. Journal of Neurophysiology, 98:3321-3329.
- Mattar A.A.G. and Ostry D.J. (2007). Neural averaging in motor learning. Journal of Neurophysiology, 97: 220–228.
- Nasir S.M. and Ostry D.J. (2008) Speech motor learning in profoundly deaf adults. Nature Neuroscience, 11:1217–1222.
- Ito T., Tiede M. and Ostry D.J. (2009) Somatosensory function in speech perception. Proc Natl Acad Sci U S A, 106:1245–1248.
- Nasir S.M. and Ostry D.J. (2009) Auditory plasticity and speech motor learning. Proc Natl Acad Sci U S A, 106:20470–20475.
- Ostry D.J., Darainy M., Mattar A.A.G., Wong J. and Gribble P.L. (2010) Somatosensory plasticity and motor learning. Journal of Neuroscience, 30:5384-5393
- Mattar A.A.G. and Ostry D.J. (2010) Generalization of dynamics learning across changes in movement amplitude. Journal of Neurophysiology, 104:426-438.
