= Spinal locomotion =

Simple Walk-Cycle

Spinal locomotion results from intricate dynamic interactions between a central program in lower thoracolumbar spine and proprioceptive feedback from body in the absence of central control by brain as in complete spinal cord injury (SCI). Following SCI, the spinal circuitry below the lesion site does not become silent; rather, it continues to maintain active and functional neuronal properties, although in a modified manner.

== Components of spinal locomotion ==
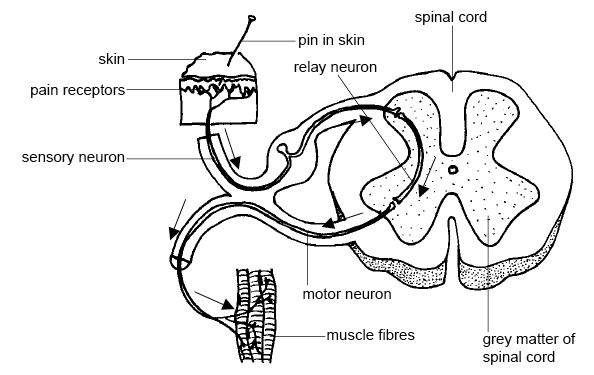
Reflex pathway: a pain receptor (sensory neuron) sends signals via the posterior horn, followed by a muscle activation (motor neuron) response via the anterior horn.

=== Centrally generated patterns ===
The spinal cord executes rhythmical and sequential activation of muscles in locomotion. The central pattern generator (CPG) provides the basic locomotor rhythm and synergies by integrating commands from various sources that serve to initiate or modulate its output to meet the requirements of the environment. CPG within the lumbosacral spinal cord segments represent an important component of the total circuitry that generates and controls posture and locomotion. This spinal circuitry can function independently in the absence of descending input from the brain to generate stable posture and locomotion and even modulate activity to match changing conditions (e.g., stepping over obstacles). This capability improve with training (spinal plasticity) and therefore it is believed that spinal cord has the capability to learn and memorize.

=== Sensory feedback ===
The sensory feedback originates from muscles, joints, tendons and skin afferents as well as from special senses and dynamically adapts the locomotor pattern of spinal cord to the requirements of the environment. These afferent sensory receptors perceive deformation of tissue, the amount of pressure (stretch or simply, placement), direction of movement, speed and velocity at which movement is occurring.

== Sensory modulation of CPG ==
Simplified schema of basic nervous system function: signals are picked up by sensory receptors and sent to the spinal cord and brain, where processing occurs AT EACH LEVEL AND results in MODULATION OF signals sent FROM the spinal cord and out to motor neurons

The dynamic interactions between Spinal cord and sensory input are ensured by modulating transmission in locomotor pathways in a state- and phase-dependent manner. For instance, proprioceptive inputs from extensors can, during stance, adjust the timing and amplitude of muscle activities of the limbs to the speed of locomotion but be silenced during the swing phase of the cycle. Similarly, skin afferents participate predominantly in the correction of limb and foot placement during stance on uneven terrain, but skin stimuli can evoke different types of responses depending on when they occur within the step cycle. Inputs from the hip appear to play a critical role in spinal locomotion. Experiments on spinal animals showed that when one limb is held with the hip flexed, locomotion on that side stops while the other limb continues walking. However, when the stopped limb is extended at the hip joint to a point normally reached at the end of stance during walking, it suddenly flexes and starts walking again provided that the contralateral limb is a position to accept the weight of the hindquarters. Other work confirmed the importance of hip afferents for locomotor rhythm generation since flexion of the hip will abolish the rhythm whereas extension will enhance it.

The spinal cord processes and interprets proprioception in a manner similar to how our visual system processes information. When a painting is viewed, the brain interprets the total visual field, as opposed to processing each individual pixel of information independently, and then derives an image. At any instant the spinal cord receives an ensemble of information from all receptors throughout the body that signals a proprioceptive “image” that represents time and space, and it computes which neurons to excite next based on the most recently perceived “images.” The importance of the CPG is not simply its ability to generate repetitive cycles, but also to receive, interpret, and predict the appropriate sequences of actions during any part of the step cycle, i.e., state dependence. The peripheral input then provides important information from which the probabilities of a given set of neurons being active at any given time can be finely tuned to a given situation during a specific phase of a step cycle. An excellent example of this is when a mechanical stimulus is applied to the dorsum of the paw of a cat. When the stimulus is applied during the swing phase, the flexor muscles of that limb are excited, and the result is enhanced flexion in order to step over the obstacle that created the stimulus. However, when the same stimulus is applied during stance, the extensors are excited. Thus, the functional connectivity between mechanoreceptors and specific interneuronal populations within the spinal cord varies according to the physiological state. Even the efficacy of the monosynaptic input from muscle spindles to the motor neuron changes readily from one part of the step cycle to another, according to whether a subject is running or walking.

In the absence of CPG, control by brain as it happens in complete spinal cord injury, sensory feedback is very important in generating rhythmic locomotion. Firstly, locomotor movements can be initiated or blocked by some proprioceptive afferent inputs. Other work confirmed the importance of hip afferents for locomotor rhythm generation since flexion of the hip will abolish the rhythm whereas extension will enhance it. Secondly, proprioceptive afferents may participate in adapting walking speed, in determining overall cycle duration, and in regulating the structure of the step cycle’s subphases (i.e., swing, stance), which is required for speed adaptation and interlimb coupling. Thirdly, proprioceptive afferents are involved in setting the level of muscle activity through various reflex pathways.

== Developmental evidence ==
Ultrasound recordings have captured in utero images of human fetuses at 13–14 gestational weeks "creeping and climbing" and producing alternating steps. Onset of stepping in the fetus precedes development and myelination of most descending brain pathways strongly suggesting human spinal cord locomotor CPG and sensory feedback coordination and plasticity. Collectively, studies across the first postnatal year indicates that a locomotor continuum extends from neonatal stepping to the onset of independent walking further suggesting human locomotion is controlled by CPG and sensory input interaction.

== Rehabilitation ==
The injured spinal cord is an “altered” spinal cord. After a SCI, supraspinal and spinal sources of control of movement differ substantially from that which existed prior to the injury, thus resulting in an altered spinal cord. The automaticity of posture and locomotion emerge from the interactions between peripheral nervous system (PNS) and central nervous system (CNS) to work in synergy, each system having intrinsic activation and inhibition patterns that can generate coordinated motor outputs.

=== Electrical stimulation ===
Numerous experiments have demonstrated that electrical stimulation (ES) of the lumbosacral enlargement and dorsal root can induce locomotor EMG patterns and even hindlimb stepping in acute and chronic low-spinal animals and humans. Increased stimulation amplitude resulted in increased EMG amplitudes and an increased frequency of rhythmic activity. High frequencies of stimulation (>70 Hz) produced tonic activity in the leg musculature, which suggests that the upper lumbar stimulation may activate neuronal structures that then recruit interneurons involved in CPG.

=== Treadmill training ===
Treadmill training (more commonly known as body weight supported treadmill training) can be applied via manual (therapist) or robotic assistance. In manual treadmill training the therapists provide assistance to facilitate an upright posture and a normal stepping pattern. Therapist assistance may be provided at the patient’s pelvis, leg and foot, and a third therapist controlling the treadmill settings. In robotic-assisted treadmill training, a device replaces the need for therapists to assist the patient in generating a normal stepping pattern. Currently, there are three different models available: Hocoma's Lokomat, the HealthSouth AutoAmbulator, and the Mechanized Gait Trainer II. The Lokomat is a driven gait orthosis that consists of a computer -controlled exoskeleton that secured to the patient’s legs while being supported over a treadmill. In addition to a belt driven treadmill and an overhead lift, the HealthSouth AutoAmbulator also includes a pair of articulated arms (that drives the hip and knee joints) and two upright structures that house the computer controls and body-weight unloading mechanism. Unlike the first two, the Mechanized Gait Trainer II does not work in conjunction with a treadmill; instead it is based on a crank and rocker gear system which provides limb motion similar to an elliptical trainer. Robotic-assisted treadmill training was developed with three goals in mind: 1. to decrease therapist physical demand and time, 2. to improve repeatability of step kinematics, and 3. to increase volume of locomotor training.

In Humans with clinically complete SCI, there is evidence that treadmill training can improve several aspects of walking with some weight support assistance. Dietz and colleagues reported that after several weeks of treadmill training, the levels of weight bearing that can be imposed on the legs of clinically complete SCI subjects during treadmill walking significantly increases. When stepping on a treadmill with body-weight support, rhythmic leg muscle activation patterns can be elicited in clinically complete subjects who are otherwise unable to voluntarily produce muscle activity in their legs. A recent study has demonstrated that the levels of leg extensor muscle activity recorded in clinically complete SCI subjects significantly improved over course of several weeks of step training. the stepping ability of clinically complete SCI subjects can improve in response to step training, but the level of improvement has not reached a level that allows complete independence from assistance during full weight-bearing. Also in humans with complete or motor-complete SCI, a novel approach using a CPG-activating drug treatment called Spinalon was shown to acutely induce episodes of rhythmic locomotor-like leg movements or corresponding electromyographic activity. Largely due to the knowledge gained from studies on spinalized animals, two general principles have emerged for exciting the spinal circuits that generate stepping:

- Body weight–supported treadmill training improves the ability of the lumbosacral spinal cord to generate weight-bearing stepping.
- Patterns of sensory input provided during locomotor training are critical for driving the plasticity that mediates locomotor recovery.

== See also ==
- Central pattern generator
- Central nervous system
- Locomotive
- Proprioception
- Spinal cord
- Spinal cord injury
- Special senses
