= Reza Shadmehr =

Iranian-American professor (born 1963)

- رضا شادمهر
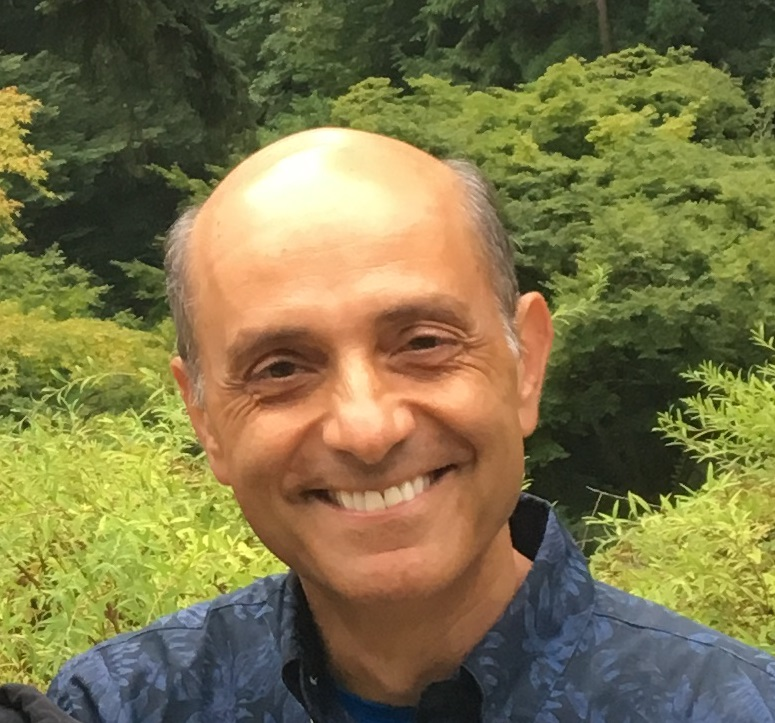
- Born: 1963 (age 62–63); Tehran, Iran
- Education: Gonzaga University
- Known for: Motor control; Motor learning; Computational neuroscience
- Scientific career
- Fields: Biomedical engineering; Computational neuroscience
- Workplaces: Johns Hopkins School of Medicine; MIT; University of Southern California
- Website: shadmehrlab.org

Reza Shadmehr (Persian: رضا شادمهر; born 1963) is an Iranian-American professor of Biomedical Engineering and Neuroscience at the Johns Hopkins School of Medicine. He is known for his contributions to the fields of motor control, motor learning, and computational neuroscience.

== Biography ==
Shadmehr was born in Tehran, Iran in 1963, and immigrated to the United States when he was 14 years old. He was raised in Spokane, WA by foster parents Lee and Evelyn Applingtion. He attended Gonzaga University, earning a BS in Electrical Engineering (summa cum laude) in 1985. He was subsequently mentored in robotics at the University of Southern California by Michael A. Arbib, where he was an IBM Graduate Fellow, completing a PhD in 1991. He then was awarded a McDonnell-Pew Postdoctoral Fellowship to attend MIT, where he was mentored in computational neuroscience by Emilio Bizzi. After MIT, he joined the Johns Hopkins University Department of Biomedical Engineering in 1995, where he has remained his entire career. He was the director of the PhD program at Johns Hopkins Biomedical Engineering department from 2007 to 2018.

Shadmehr was elected as a fellow of the American Institute for Medical and Biological Engineering in 2017. In 2022 he received a Javits Award in the Neurosciences.

== Research ==
Shadmehr studies the problem of how the brain controls movements of the arm and the eyes, using a broad set of approaches, including computational, behavioral, and neurophysiological techniques, in both humans and monkeys. The main idea of his research is to use robotics and control theory as a framework for how the brain controls movements. While at MIT, he invented an influential paradigm to study mechanism of motor control in humans and other mammals. The “force field” paradigm allows one to investigate how the brain learns internal models that help control the physics of our body and the objects that we interact with. This paradigm led to the discovery that a function of the cerebellum is to transform motor commands into predictions of sensory consequences. These neural models are internal representations of physics that the brain learns through experience of prediction errors. Once learned, the neural models may become the basis of control for voluntary movements.

An important discovery was regarding how cells in the cerebellum are organized into populations that make predictions and learn from prediction errors. The discovery of this population coding has made it possible to understand the language used by neurons of the cerebellum to build internal models that relate actions to their consequences.

== Books ==
- Shadmehr, Reza; Wise, Steven P. (2005). The computational neurobiology of reaching and pointing: a foundation for motor learning. Cambridge, Massachusetts: MIT Press. ISBN 0-262-19508-9. OCLC 54529569.
- Shadmehr, Reza; Mussa-Ivaldi, Sandro (2012). Biological learning and control: how the brain builds representations, predicts events, and makes decisions. Cambridge, Massachusetts: MIT Press. ISBN 978-0-262-30128-2. OCLC 775571543.
- Shadmehr, Reza; Ahmed, Alaa A. (2020). Vigor : neuroeconomics of movement control. Cambridge, Massachusetts: MIT Press. ISBN 9780262044059. OCLC 1290799990.
