= Nikolai Bernstein =

Soviet neurophysiologist (1896–1966)

- Николай Бернштейн
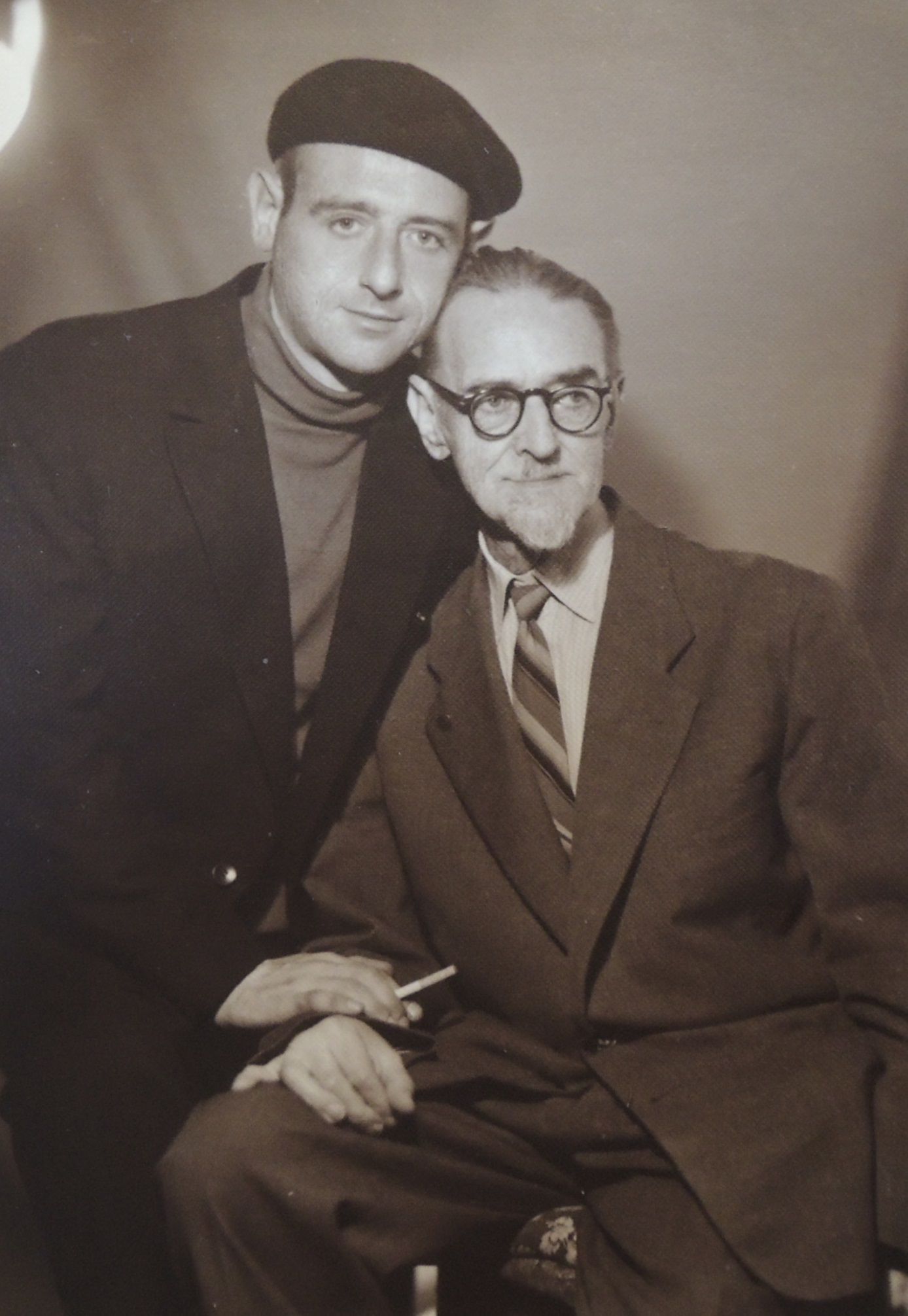
- Bernstein with his son
- Born: 5 November 1896; Moscow, Russian Empire
- Died: 16 January 1966 (aged 69); Moscow, Russian SFSR, Soviet Union
- Resting place: Novodevichye Cemetery
- Education: Moscow State University
- Scientific career
- Fields: Physiology
- Workplaces: Central Institute of Labour Institute of Experimental Medicine; Buryat State University Russian State University of Physical Education, Sport, Youth and Tourism

Nikolai Aleksandrovich Bernstein (Russian: Николай Александрович Бернштейн; 5 November 1896 – 16 January 1966) was a Soviet neurophysiologist who has pioneered motion-tracking devices and formal processing of information obtained from the use of these devices. He was also one of first psychologists to suggest that behaviour is generative, constructive and not reactive. He was born and died in Moscow.

== Life ==
Nikolai Bernstein graduated high school in 1913. He was interested in languages and philosophy and wanted to be a linguist so he enrolled at Moscow University to study History and Philology. However, as World War I broke out in the summer of 1914, the Bernstein family felt the need to help their country during these hard times. Nikolai then took an alternative route in his education and started attending the medical college where he graduated in 1919 with a medical degree. Nikolai was then drafted into the Red Army as a doctor. After his service ended in 1921 his father helped him get a job as a physician at the Gilyarovsky Psychiatric Clinic till his father's death, he then took over his father's practice who was also a physician.

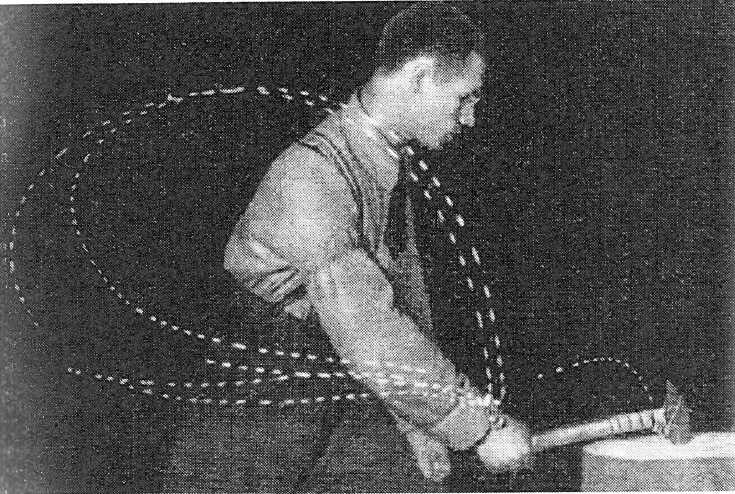
A cyclogram of cutting metal with a chisel and hammer. Aleksei Gastev in the laboratory of the Central Institute of Labor

His first scientific work was in 1922, when he, along with other researchers, were invited to study movement during manual labour in Moscow's Central Institute of Labour. The purpose of the study was to optimize productivity, and Bernstein's analysis focused on cutting metal with a chisel. He used cyclographic techniques to track human movement, a technique he would continue using for many of his experiments. His research showed that most movements, like hitting a chisel with a hammer, are composed of smaller movements. Any one of these smaller movements, if altered, affect the movement as a whole.

In 1926, Bernstein started a series of experiments that examined human walking. Originally, this work was to help with the engineering of pedestrian bridges. He studied the development of walking as humans matured and aged, and he also examined the gaits of those with brain damage.

In 1935, he received a Doctor of Science degree without submitting a thesis. He was also one of the first members of the USSR Academy of Medical Sciences, founded in 1944. In 1948, he was awarded the Stalin Prize for science.

In 1960 Norbert Wiener visited Moscow. He met Bernstein, who alongside Alexander Luria also acted as interpreter for Wiener when he delivered his lecture at Moscow State University. His seminal book, The Co-ordination and Regulation of Movements, was translated into English from Russian and published in 1967.

== Work ==
Bernstein discovered several phenomena and offered several original insights into the construction of actions.

=== Pioneering kinesiology tracking devices ===
Bernstein was one of the pioneers in the field of motor control and motor learning, inventing original devices that track the motion of people with and without experience in actions.

=== Formulation of "Degrees of Freedom" problem ===
The field of motor control basically studies how the Central Nervous System (CNS) controls posture and movement. Understanding how humans plan and control movement is a major challenge because of the large number of joints that provide the human musculoskeletal system with numerous kinematic degrees of freedom. Because the goal of most movement tasks, like moving a hand to a target, is defined in terms of a much smaller number of kinematic degrees of freedom, it can be achieved in an infinite number of different ways (also referred to as the "Degrees of freedom problem" or 'inverse kinematics problem'). Furthermore, the number of muscles acting across a joint generally exceeds the number of kinematic degrees of freedom of that joint. As a result, a given movement can be realized with an infinite number of muscle activation patterns (also referred to as the 'inverse dynamics problem'). Even though a goal can be reached in an infinite number of ways, many studies have revealed very consistent and stereotypical patterns of kinematics and muscle activation. Evidently, the Central Nervous System (CNS) is capable of adequately controlling the many degrees of freedom. This question of how the CNS is capable of adequately controlling the many degrees of freedom of the musculoskeletal system was first addressed by Bernstein and is now known as the 'Bernstein problem' (though distinct from Bernstein's problem in mathematics).

=== Constructivism theory ===
In Bernstein's time Pavlovian theory was the dominant theory of psychology, which was developed into Behaviourism, as its extreme form. Behaviourism (but not Ivan Pavlov himself) suggested that behaviour runs on conditional reflexes that repeat past experience. Contrarily to that, Bernstein suggested a paradoxic principle: "none of the actions is repeated but every action is constructed anew; it's just a matter what level regulates this construction".

=== Theory of multi-leveled regulation ===
He proposed a theory of "levels of control over action construction" that later were echoed in levels of control in cognitive psychology. He was likely very much influenced by the work of John Hughlings Jackson, who posited a hierarchical organization of the nervous system. Using the idea of five levels of control that are used differently for the tasks of different complexity and novelty, Bernstein pointed out to the transfer of the conscious level of regulation of actions by the frontal cortex to the striatal systems during learning, i.e. to the more automatic levels, correctly linking habitual, automatic level of regulation to the "pallidal" (Globus pallidus) systems, as it was indeed later confirmed by neuroscience. He also suggested that the CNS is capable of "functionally freezing degrees of freedom". As an analogy, controlling the four wheels of a car independently is very difficult. Yet, by functionally freezing degrees of freedom (the two rear wheels are only allowed to rotate around one shared horizontal axis, and the two front wheels are also allowed to rotate in parallel around a longitudinal axis, controlled by the steering wheel), a car becomes much easier to control.

=== Pioneering the science of kinesiology ===
Bernstein work opened a new discipline called kinesiology that studies the structure and mechanisms of motion. American kinesiologist Karl Newell is one of many to be greatly influenced by Bernstein. Newell (1986) arranged constraints into three main groups: Individual (structural or functional), task, and environmental constraints.

=== His model of stages of action construction ===
Bernstein also did major work with motor learning, creating a model for stages of construction of any action, including learning. That model included the blocks of "information gathering", "programming (integration and sequencing of actions), internal model of future result, execution, a comparator of results with expected model (feedback block) and running the cycle of action again with an adjustment calculated as a difference between expected and received result. His work in the 1950s and 1960s was remarkably insightful and is still valid and respected today. Similar models were used later by neuropsychologist Alexander Luria, neurophysiologist Pyotr Anokhin and the neurochemical framework Functional Ensemble of Temperament.

=== Early Embodied Cognition theory ===
In his 1935 book, Bernstein gave detailed examples (with illustrations) and justification of what is now called "Embodied cognition theory. This theory points out the role (and biases) of the body in the processing of information. For example, Bernstein described how people watching someone doing a tense physical action, tense their own muscles in a similar position and perform gesticulation imitating the people whom they are watching. Bernstein underlined the role of the posture-level control over actions and referred to his theory of the levels of control.

=== Early theory of kibernetics and biomechanics ===
Bernstein also coined the term biomechanics, the study of movement through the application of mechanical principles.

== See also ==
- Runbot, a "fast-walking" robot, whose movements and adaptability are based on Bernstein's theories.

== Publications ==
=== In Russian ===
- Obshchaya Biomekhanika, "General Biomechanics" (1926)
- Biomekhanika dlya Instruktorov, "Biomechanics for Instructors" (Moscow, 1926)
- O Poestroenii Dvizhenni, "On the Construction of Movements" (1947)
- Ocherki po Fiziologii Dvizheniy i Fiziologii Aktivnosti, "Essays on Physiology of Movements and Activity Physiology" (1966)
- O Lovkosti i ee Razvitii, "On Dexterity and its Development" (1991)
- Sovremennye Iskaniia v Fiziologii Nervnogo Protsessa, "Contemporary Inquiries into the Physiology of the Nervous Process" (Moscow, 2003)

=== English translations ===
- The Co-ordination and Regulation of Movements, Pergamon Press (Oxford, 1967)
- Dexterity and Its Development, Lawrence Erlbaum Associates (1996), republished by Psychology Press (2009), Routledge (Oxford and New York, 2016)
- Biomechanics for Instructors, Springer (Switzerland, 2020)
- Bernstein's Construction of Movements: Original Text and Commentaries, Routledge (New York and Abingdon, 2020)

=== German translations ===
- Bewegungsphysiologie, "Movement Physiology" (Leipzig, 1982)
- Die Entwicklung der Bewegungsfertigkeiten, "The Development of Movement Skills", Chapter 8 of O Poestroenii Dvizhenni (Leipzig, 1996)
