= Sandro Mussa-Ivaldi =

Italian professor

Ferdinando (Sandro) Mussa-Ivaldi is an Italian born professor at Northwestern University. He is known for his contributions to the fields of motor control, motor learning and computational neuroscience.

== Biography ==
Sandro Mussa-Ivaldi obtained a degree (Laurea) in Physics from the University of Torino (1978) and a PhD in biomedical engineering from the Politecnico di Milano (1987). He was a postdoctoral fellow and principal research scientist in the Department of Brain and Cognitive Sciences at the MIT.

He is now Professor of Physiology, Physical Medicine and Rehabilitation and Biomedical Engineering at Northwestern University. He is the founder and director of the Robotics Laboratory in the Rehabilitation Institute of Chicago.

== Scientific contributions ==
Mussa-Ivaldi’s research combines experimental methods with the application of computational principles. His experimental work has been influential for the study of arm biomechanics and, in particular, motor learning in human subjects. He has also studied motor primitives in the frog's spinal cord that are a central issue in many theories of motor control. Sandro Mussa-Ivaldi's theoretical work has focused on the analysis of redundant kinematics in human subjects. He has asked how a variety of movement patterns and control strategies can be constructed from the superposition of a set of basis fields. Of particular theoretical importance is his discovery of how pseudoinverses of Jacobians can be computed so that integrability is always a given. In some more recent work, Sandro Mussa-Ivaldi has applied computational ideas to the design of brain machine interfaces. He and his collaborators have developed the first neurorobotic system in which a neural preparation in-vitro - the brainstem of a Lamprey - controls the behavior of a mobile-robot through a closed-loop interaction. Recent research in the lab of Dr. Mussa-Ivaldi addresses clinical questions where computational insights can be used to better the lives of persons with disabilities.
