= Emilio Bizzi =

American neuroscientist (born 1933)

- Born: February 22, 1933 (age 93); Rome, Italy
- Education: University of Rome (MD); University of Pisa (PhD)
- Known for: Motor control and skills, President of the American Academy of Arts and Sciences (2006)
- Awards: W. Alden Spencer Award (1978); Elected to National Academy of Sciences (1986) & Institute of Medicine (2005), President of Italy's Gold Medal for Scientific Contributions (2005)
- Scientific career
- Fields: Neuroscience
- Workplaces: Brain and Cognitive Sciences, MIT

Emilio Bizzi (born February 22, 1933) is a neuroscientist and Institute Professor at the Massachusetts Institute of Technology. He is an investigator of the McGovern Institute for Brain Research and a faculty member in the Department of Brain and Cognitive Sciences. He received his MD from the University of Rome in 1958 and his PhD from the University of Pisa in 1968. In Pisa, he performed seminal measurements of brain waves during sleep.

Bizzi joined MIT as a Research Associate in 1966, was appointed Associate Professor in 1969, and tenured in 1972. He was Director of the Whitaker College of Health Sciences, Technology, and Management between 1983 and 1987 and head of the Department of Brain and Cognitive Sciences from 1986 to 1997. In 2006, he was elected as President of the American Academy of Arts and Sciences.

His research focuses on how the central nervous system translates brain messages signaling motor intent into muscle activation. He also studies how motor control is affected by stroke damage and how computational analysis of motor control can be harnessed to improve rehabilitation methods for stroke patients.
