= Motor control =

Regulation of movement within organisms possessing a nervous system

Motor control is the regulation of movements in organisms that possess a nervous system. Motor control includes conscious voluntary movements, subconscious muscle memory and involuntary reflexes, as well as instinctual taxes.

To control movement, the nervous system must integrate multimodal sensory information (both from the external world as well as proprioception) and elicit the necessary signals to recruit muscles to carry out a goal. This pathway spans many disciplines, including multisensory integration, signal processing, coordination, biomechanics, and cognition, and the computational challenges are often discussed under the term sensorimotor control. Successful motor control is crucial to interacting with the world to carry out goals as well as for posture, balance, and stability.

Some researchers (mostly neuroscientists studying movement, such as Daniel Wolpert and Randy Flanagan) argue that motor control is the reason brains exist at all.

== Neural control of muscle force ==
All movements, e.g. touching your nose, require motor neurons to fire action potentials that results in contraction of muscles. In humans, ~150,000 motor neurons control the contraction of ~600 muscles. To produce movements, a subset of 600 muscles must contract in a temporally precise pattern to produce the right force at the right time.

=== Motor units and force production ===
A single motor neuron and the muscle fibers it innervates are called a motor unit. For example, the rectus femoris contains approximately 1 million muscle fibers, which are controlled by around 1000 motor neurons. Activity in the motor neuron causes contraction in all of the innervated muscle fibers so that they function as a unit. Increasing action potential frequency (spike rate) in the motor neuron increases the muscle fiber contraction force, up to the maximal force. The maximal force depends on the contractile properties of the muscle fibers. Within a motor unit, all the muscle fibers are of the same type (e.g. type I (slow twitch) or Type II fibers (fast twitch)), and motor units of multiple types make up a given muscle. Motor units of a given muscle are collectively referred to as a motor pool.

The force produced in a given muscle thus depends on: 1) How many motor neurons are active, and their spike rates; 2) the contractile properties and number of muscle fibers innervated by the active neurons. To generate more force, increase the spike rates of active motor neurons and/or recruiting more and stronger motor units. In turn, how the muscle force produces limb movement depends on the limb biomechanics, e.g. where the tendon and muscle originate (which bone, and precise location) and where the muscle inserts on the bone that it moves.

=== Recruitment order ===
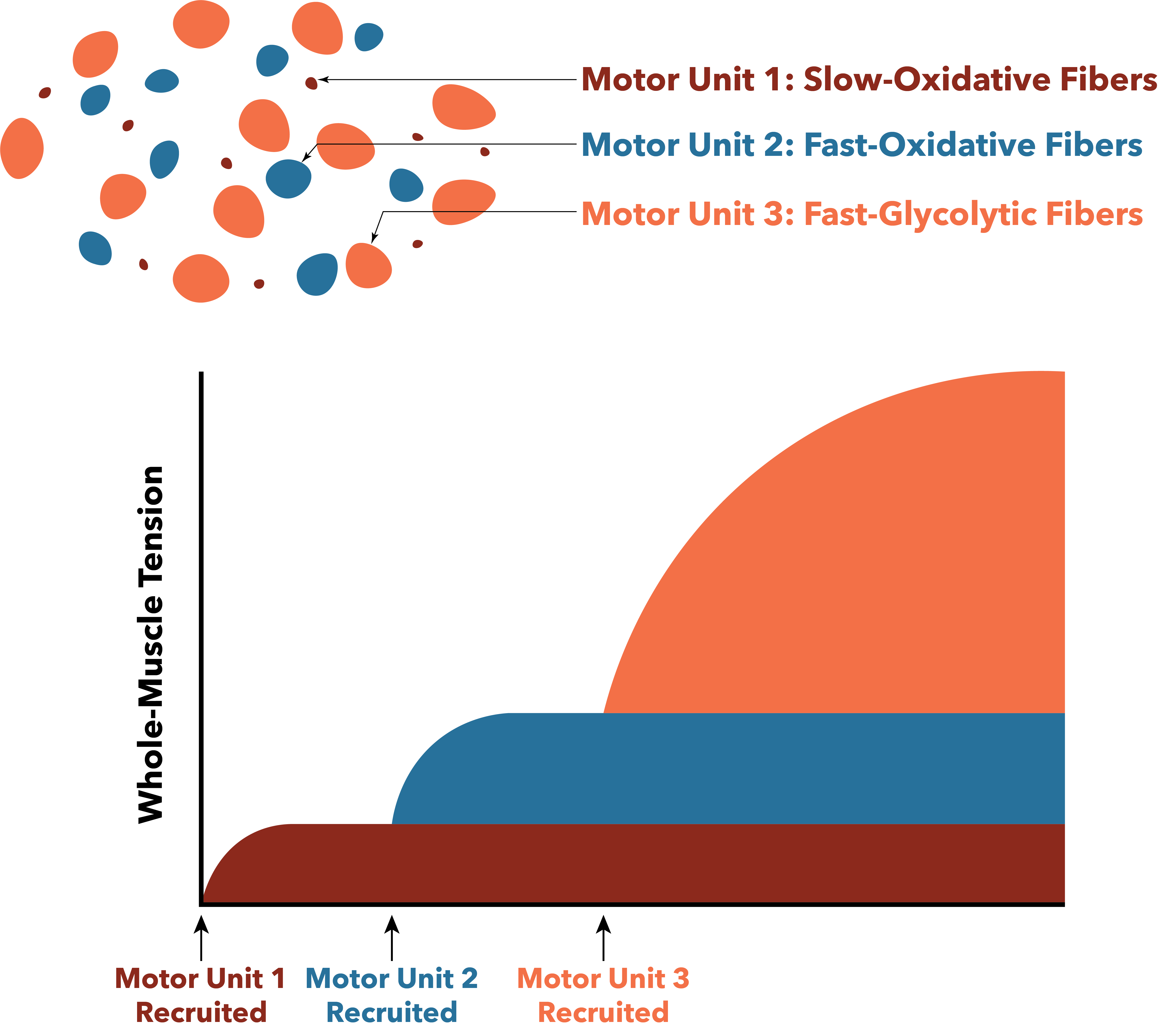
Motor unit recruitment

Motor units within a motor pool are recruited in a stereotypical order, from motor units that produce small amounts of force per spike, to those producing the largest force per spike. The gradient of motor unit force is correlated with a gradient in motor neuron soma size and motor neuron electrical excitability. This relationship was described by Elwood Henneman and is known as Henneman's size principle, a fundamental discovery of neuroscience and an organizing principle of motor control.

For tasks requiring small forces, such as continual adjustment of posture, motor units with fewer muscle fibers that are slowly-contracting, but less fatigueable, are used. As more force is required, motor units with fast twitch, fast-fatigeable muscle fibers are recruited.

== Computational issues of motor control ==
The nervous system produces movement by selecting which motor neurons are activated, and when. The finding that a recruitment order exists within a motor pool is thought to reflect a simplification of the problem: if a particular muscle should produce a particular force, then activate the motor pool along its recruitment hierarchy until that force is produced.

But then how to choose what force to produce in each muscle? The nervous system faces the following issues in solving this problem.

1. Redundancy. Infinite trajectories of movements can accomplish a goal (e.g. touch my nose). How is a trajectory chosen? Which trajectory is best?
2. Noise. Noise is defined as small fluctuations that are unrelated to a signal, which can occur in neurons and synaptic connections at any point from sensation to muscle contraction.
3. Delays. Motor neuron activity precedes muscle contraction, which precedes the movement. Sensory signals also reflect events that have already occurred. Such delays affect the choice of motor program.
4. Uncertainty. Uncertainty arises because of neural noise, but also because inferences about the state of the world may not be correct (e.g. speed of on coming ball).
5. Nonstationarity. Even as a movement is being executed, the state of the world changes, even through such simple effects as reactive forces on the rest of the body, causing translation of a joint while it is actuated.
6. Nonlinearity. The effects of neural activity and muscle contraction are highly non-linear, which the nervous system must account for when predicting the consequences of a pattern of motor neuron activity.

Much ongoing research is dedicated to investigating how the nervous system deals with these issues, both at the behavioral level, as well as how neural circuits in the brain and spinal cord represent and deal with these factors to produce the fluid movements we witness in animals.

"Optimal feedback control" is an influential theoretical framing of these computation issues.

== Model systems for motor control ==
All organisms face the computational challenges above, so neural circuits for motor control have been studied in humans, monkeys, horses, cats, mice, fish lamprey, flies, locusts, and nematodes, among many others. Mammalian model systems like mice and monkeys offer the most straightforward comparative models for human health and disease. They are widely used to study the role of higher brain regions common to vertebrates, including the cerebral cortex, thalamus, basal ganglia and deep brain medullary and reticular circuits for motor control. The genetics and neurophysiology of motor circuits in the spine have also been studied in mammalian model organisms, but protective vertebrae make it difficult to study the functional role of spinal circuits in behaving animals. Here, larval and adult fish have been useful in discovering the functional logic of the local spinal circuits that coordinate motor neuron activity. Invertebrate model organisms do not have the same brain regions as vertebrates, but their brains must solve similar computational issues and thus are thought to have brain regions homologous to those involved in motor control in the vertebrate nervous system, The organization of arthropod nervous systems into ganglia that control each leg as allowed researchers to record from neurons dedicated to moving a specific leg during behavior.

Model systems have also demonstrated the role of central pattern generators in driving rhythmic movements. A central pattern generator is a neural network that can generate rhythmic activity in the absence of an external control signal, such as a signal descending from the brain or feedback signals from sensors in the limbs (e.g. proprioceptors). Evidence suggests that real CPGs exist in several key motor control regions, such as the stomachs of arthropods or the pre-Boetzinger complex that control breathing in humans. Furthermore, as a theoretical concept, CPGs have been useful to frame the possible role of sensory feedback in motor control.

== Sensorimotor feedback ==
=== Response to stimuli ===
The process of becoming aware of a sensory stimulus and using that information to influence an action occurs in stages. Reaction time of simple tasks can be used to reveal information about these stages. Reaction time refers to the period of time between when the stimulus is presented, and the end of the response. Movement time is the time it takes to complete the movement. Some of the first reaction time experiments were carried out by Franciscus Donders, who used the difference in response times to a choice task to determine the length of time needed to process the stimuli and choose the correct response. While this approach is ultimately flawed, it gave rise to the idea that reaction time was made up of a stimulus identification, followed by a response selection, and ultimately culminates in carrying out the correct movement. Further research has provided evidence that these stages do exist, but that the response selection period of any reaction time increases as the number of available choices grows, a relationship known as Hick's law.

=== Closed loop control ===
The classical definition of a closed loop system for human movement comes from Jack A. Adams (1971). A reference of the desired output is compared to the actual output via error detection mechanisms; using feedback, the error is corrected for. Most movements that are carried out during day-to-day activity are formed using a continual process of accessing sensory information and using it to more accurately continue the motion. This type of motor control is called feedback control, as it relies on sensory feedback to control movements. Feedback control is a situated form of motor control, relying on sensory information about performance and specific sensory input from the environment in which the movement is carried out. This sensory input, while processed, does not necessarily cause conscious awareness of the action. Closed loop control is a feedback based mechanism of motor control, where any act on the environment creates some sort of change that affects future performance through feedback. Closed loop motor control is best suited to continuously controlled actions, but does not work quickly enough for ballistic actions. Ballistic actions are actions that continue to the end without thinking about it, even when they no longer are appropriate. Because feedback control relies on sensory information, it is as slow as sensory processing. These movements are subject to a speed-accuracy trade-off, because sensory processing is being used to control the movement, the faster the movement is carried out, the less accurate it becomes.

=== Open loop control ===
The classical definition from Jack A. Adams is: "An open loop system has no feedback or mechanisms for error regulation. The input events for a system exert their influence, the system effects its transformation on the input and the system has an output...... A traffic light with fixed timing snarls traffic when the load is heavy and impedes the flow when the traffic is light. The system has no compensatory capability."

Some movements, however, occur too quickly to integrate sensory information, and instead must rely on feed forward control. Open loop control is a feed forward form of motor control, and is used to control rapid, ballistic movements that end before any sensory information can be processed. To best study this type of control, most research focuses on deafferentation studies, often involving cats or monkeys whose sensory nerves have been disconnected from their spinal cords. Monkeys who lost all sensory information from their arms resumed normal behavior after recovering from the deafferentation procedure. Most skills were relearned, but fine motor control became very difficult. It has been shown that the open loop control can be adapted to different disease conditions and can therefore be used to extract signatures of different motor disorders by varying the cost functional governing the system.

== Coordination ==
A core motor control issue is coordinating the various components of the motor system to act in unison to produce movement.

Peripheral neurons receive input from the central nervous system and innervate the muscles. In turn, muscles generate forces which actuate joints. Getting the pieces to work together is a challenging problem for the motor system and how this problem is resolved is an active area of study in motor control research.

=== Reflexes ===
In some cases the coordination of motor components is hard-wired, consisting of fixed neuromuscular pathways that are called reflexes. Reflexes are typically characterized as automatic and fixed motor responses, and they occur on a much faster time scale than what is possible for reactions that depend on perceptual processing. Reflexes play a fundamental role in stabilizing the motor system, providing almost immediate compensation for small perturbations and maintaining fixed execution patterns. Some reflex loops are routed solely through the spinal cord without receiving input from the brain, and thus do not require attention or conscious control. Others involve lower brain areas and can be influenced by prior instructions or intentions, but they remain independent of perceptual processing and online control.

The simplest reflex is the monosynaptic reflex or short-loop reflex, such as the monosynaptic stretch response. In this example, Ia afferent neurons are activated by muscle spindles when they deform due to the stretching of the muscle. In the spinal cord, these afferent neurons synapse directly onto alpha motor neurons that regulate the contraction of the same muscle. Thus, any stretching of a muscle automatically signals a reflexive contraction of that muscle, without any central control. As the name and the description implies, monosynaptic reflexes depend on a single synaptic connection between an afferent sensory neuron and efferent motor neuron. In general the actions of monosynaptic reflexes are fixed and cannot be controlled or influenced by intention or instruction. However, there is some evidence to suggest that the gain or magnitude of these reflexes can be adjusted by context and experience.

Polysynaptic reflexes or long-loop reflexes are reflex arcs which involve more than a single synaptic connection in the spinal cord. These loops may include cortical regions of the brain as well, and are thus slower than their monosynaptic counterparts due to the greater travel time. However, actions controlled by polysynaptic reflex loops are still faster than actions which require perceptual processing. While the actions of short-loop reflexes are fixed, polysynaptic reflexes can often be regulated by instruction or prior experience. A common example of a long loop reflex is the asymmetrical tonic neck reflex observed in infants.

=== Synergies ===
A motor synergy is a neural organization of a multi-element system that (1) organizes sharing of a task among a set of elemental variables; and (2) ensures co-variation among elemental variables with the purpose to stabilize performance variables. The components of a synergy need not be physically connected, but instead are connected by their response to perceptual information about the particular motor task being executed. Synergies are learned, rather than being hardwired like reflexes, and are organized in a task-dependent manner; a synergy is structured for a particular action and not determined generally for the components themselves. Nikolai Bernstein famously demonstrated synergies at work in the hammering actions of professional blacksmiths. The muscles of the arm controlling the movement of the hammer are informationally linked in such a way that errors and variability in one muscle are automatically compensated for by the actions of the other muscles. These compensatory actions are reflex-like in that they occur faster than perceptual processing would seem to allow, yet they are only present in expert performance, not in novices. In the case of blacksmiths, the synergy in question is organized specifically for hammering actions and is not a general purpose organization of the muscles of the arm. Synergies have two defining characteristics in addition to being task dependent; sharing and flexibility/stability.

"Sharing" requires that the execution of a particular motor task depends on the combined actions of all the components that make up the synergy. Often, there are more components involved than are strictly needed for the particular task (see "Redundancy" below), but the control of that motor task is distributed across all components nonetheless. A simple demonstration comes from a two-finger force production task, where participants are required to generate a fixed amount of force by pushing down on two force plates with two different fingers. In this task, participants generated a particular force output by combining the contributions of independent fingers. While the force produced by any single finger can vary, this variation is constrained by the action of the other such that the desired force is always generated.

Co-variation also provides "flexibility and stability" to motor tasks. Considering again the force production task, if one finger did not produce enough force, it could be compensated for by the other. The components of a motor synergy are expected to change their action to compensate for the errors and variability in other components that could affect the outcome of the motor task. This provides flexibility because it allows for multiple motor solutions to particular tasks, and it provides motor stability by preventing errors in individual motor components from affecting the task itself.

Synergies simplify the computational difficulty of motor control. Coordinating the numerous degrees of freedom in the body is a challenging problem, both because of the tremendous complexity of the motor system, as well as the different levels at which this organization can occur (neural, muscular, kinematic, spatial, etc.). Because the components of a synergy are functionally coupled for a specific task, execution of motor tasks can be accomplished by activating the relevant synergy with a single neural signal. The need to control all of the relevant components independently is removed because organization emerges automatically as a consequence of the systematic covariation of components. Similar to how reflexes are physically connected and thus do not require control of individual components by the central nervous system, actions can be executed through synergies with minimal executive control because they are functionally connected. Beside motor synergies, the term of sensory synergies has recently been introduced. Sensory synergy are believed to play an important role in integrating the mixture of environmental inputs to provide low-dimensional information to the CNS thus guiding the recruitment of motor synergies.

Synergies are fundamental for controlling complex movements, such as the ones of the hand during grasping. Their importance has been demonstrated for both muscle control and in the kinematic domain in several studies, lately on studies including large cohorts of subjects. The relevance of synergies for hand grasps is also enforced by studies on hand grasp taxonomies, showing muscular and kinematic similarities among specific groups of grasps, leading to specific clusters of movements.

=== Motor Programs ===
While synergies represent coordination derived from peripheral interactions of motor components, motor programs are specific, pre-structured motor activation patterns that are generated and executed by a central controller (in the case of a biological organism, the brain). They represent at top-down approach to motor coordination, rather than the bottom-up approach offered by synergies. Motor programs are executed in an open-loop manner, although sensory information is most likely used to sense the current state of the organism and determine the appropriate goals. However, similar to central pattern generators, once the program has been executed, it cannot be altered online by additional sensory information.

Evidence for the existence of motor programs comes from studies of rapid movement execution and the difficulty associated with changing those movements once they have been initiated. For example, people who are asked to make fast arm swings have extreme difficulty in halting that movement when provided with a "STOP" signal after the movement has been initiated. This reversal difficulty persists even if the stop signal is presented after the initial "GO" signal but before the movement actually begins. This research suggests that once selection and execution of a motor program begins, it must run to completion before another action can be taken. This effect has been found even when the movement that is being executed by a particular motor program is prevented from occurring at all. People who attempt to execute particular movements (such as pushing with the arm), but unknowingly have the action of their body arrested before any movement can actually take place, show the same muscle activation patterns (including stabilizing and support activation that does not actually generate the movement) as when they are allowed to complete their intended action.

Although the evidence for motor programs seems persuasive, there have been several important criticisms of the theory. The first is the problem of storage. If each movement an organism could generate requires its own motor program, it would seem necessary for that organism to possess an unlimited repository of such programs and where these would be kept is not clear. Aside from the enormous memory requirements such a facility would take, no motor program storage area in the brain has yet been identified. The second problem is concerned with novelty in movement. If a specific motor program is required for any particular movement, it is not clear how one would ever produce a novel movement. At best, an individual would have to practice any new movement before executing it with any success, and at worst, would be incapable of new movements because no motor program would exist for new movements. These difficulties have led to a more nuanced notion of motor programs known as generalized motor programs. A generalized motor program is a program for a particular class of action, rather than a specific movement. This program is parameterized by the context of the environment and the current state of the organism.

=== Redundancy ===
An important issue for coordinating the motor system is the problem of the redundancy of motor degrees of freedom. As detailed in the "Synergies" section, many actions and movements can be executed in multiple ways because functional synergies controlling those actions are able to co-vary without changing the outcome of the action. This is possible because there are more motor components involved in the production of actions than are generally required by the physical constraints on that action. For example, the human arm has seven joints which determine the position of the hand in the world. However, only three spatial dimensions are needed to specify any location the hand could be placed in. This excess of kinematic degrees of freedom means that there are multiple arm configurations that correspond to any particular location of the hand.

Some of the earliest and most influential work on the study of motor redundancy came from the Russian physiologist Nikolai Bernstein. Bernstein's research was primarily concerned with understanding how coordination was developed for skilled actions. He observed that the redundancy of the motor system made it possible to execute actions and movements in a multitude of different ways while achieving equivalent outcomes. This equivalency in motor action means that there is no one-to-one correspondence between the desired movements and the coordination of the motor system needed to execute those movements. Any desired movement or action does not have a particular coordination of neurons, muscles, and kinematics that make it possible. This motor equivalency problem became known as the degrees of freedom problem because it is a product of having redundant degrees of freedom available in the motor system.

== Perception in motor control ==
Related, yet distinct from the issue of how the processing of sensory information affects the control of movements and actions is the question of how the perception of the world structures action. Perception is extremely important in motor control because it carries the relevant information about objects, environments and bodies which is used in organizing and executing actions and movements. What is perceived and how the subsequent information is used to organize the motor system is an ongoing area of research.

=== Model based control strategies ===
Most model based strategies of motor control rely on perceptual information, but assume that this information is not always useful, veridical or constant. Optical information is interrupted by eye blinks, motion is obstructed by objects in the environment, distortions can change the appearance of object shape. Model based and representational control strategies are those that rely on accurate internal models of the environment, constructed from a combination of perceptual information and prior knowledge, as the primary source information for planning and executing actions, even in the absence of perceptual information.

==== Inference and indirect perception ====
Many models of the perceptual system assume indirect perception, or the notion that the world that gets perceived is not identical to the actual environment. Environmental information must go through several stages before being perceived, and the transitions between these stages introduce ambiguity. What actually gets perceived is the mind's best guess about what is occurring in the environment based on previous experience. Support for this idea comes from the Ames room illusion, where a distorted room causes the viewer to see objects known to be a constant size as growing or shrinking as they move around the room. The room itself is seen as being square, or at least consisting of right angles, as all previous rooms the perceiver has encountered have had those properties. Another example of this ambiguity comes from the doctrine of specific nerve energies. The doctrine presents the finding that there are distinct nerve types for different types of sensory input, and these nerves respond in a characteristic way regardless of the method of stimulation. That is to say, the color red causes optical nerves to fire in a specific pattern that is processed by the brain as experiencing the color red. However, if that same nerve is electrically stimulated in an identical pattern, the brain could perceive the color red when no corresponding stimuli is present.

==== Forward models ====
Forward models are a predictive internal model of motor control that takes the available perceptual information, combined with a particular motor program, and tries to predict the outcome of the planned motor movement. Forward models structure action by determining how the forces, velocities, and positions of motor components affect changes in the environment and in the individual. It is proposed that forward models help with the Neural control of limb stiffness when individuals interact with their environment. Forward models are thought to use motor programs as input to predict the outcome of an action. An error signal is generated when the predictions made by a forward model do not match the actual outcome of the movement, prompting an update of an existing model and providing a mechanism for learning. These models explain why it is impossible to tickle yourself. A sensation is experienced as ticklish when it is unpredictable. However, forward models predict the outcome of your motor movements, meaning the motion is predictable, and therefore not ticklish.

Evidence for forward models comes from studies of motor adaptation. When a person's goal-directed reaching movements are perturbed by a force field, they gradually, but steadily, adapt the movement of their arm to allow them to again reach their goal. However, they do so in such a way that preserves some high level movement characteristics; bell-shaped velocity profiles, straight line translation of the hand, and smooth, continuous movements. These movement features are recovered, despite the fact that they require startlingly different arm dynamics (i.e. torques and forces). This recovery provides evidence that what is motivating movement is a particular motor plan, and the individual is using a forward model to predict how arm dynamics change the movement of the arm to achieve particular task level characteristics. Differences between the expected arm movement and the observed arm movement produces an error signal which is used as the basis for learning. Additional evidence for forward models comes from experiments which require subjects to determine the location of an effector following an unvisualized movement

==== Inverse models ====
Inverse models predict the necessary movements of motor components to achieve a desired perceptual outcome. They can also take the outcome of a motion and attempt to determine the sequence of motor commands that resulted in that state. These types of models are particularly useful for open loop control, and allow for specific types of movements, such as fixating on a stationary object while the head is moving. Complementary to forward models, inverse models attempt to estimate how to achieve a particular perceptual outcome in order to generate the appropriate motor plan. Because inverse models and forward model are so closely associated, studies of internal models are often used as evidence for the roles of both model types in action.

Motor adaptation studies, therefore, also make a case for inverse models. Motor movements seem to follow predefined "plans" that preserve certain invariant features of the movement. In the reaching task mentioned above, the persistence of bell-shaped velocity profiles and smooth, straight hand trajectories provides evidence for the existence of such plans. Movements that achieve these desired task-level outcomes are estimated by an inverse model. Adaptation therefore proceeds as a process of estimating the necessary movements with an inverse model, simulating with a forward model the outcome of those movement plans, observing the difference between the desired outcome and the actual outcome, and updating the models for a future attempt.

=== Information based control ===
An alternative to model based control is information based control. Informational control strategies organize movements and actions based on perceptual information about the environment, rather than on cognitive models or representations of the world. The actions of the motor system are organized by information about the environment and information about the current state of the agent. Information based control strategies often treat the environment and the organism as a single system, with action proceeding as a natural consequence of the interactions of this system. A core assumption of information based control strategies is that perceptions of the environment are rich in information and veridical for the purposes of producing actions. This runs counter to the assumptions of indirect perception made by model based control strategies.

==== Direct perception ====
Direct perception in the cognitive sense is related to the philosophical notion of naïve or direct realism in that it is predicated on the assumption that what we perceive is what is actually in the world. James J. Gibson is credited with recasting direct perception as ecological perception. While the problem of indirect perception proposes that physical information about object in our environment is not available due to the ambiguity of sensory information, proponents of direct perception (like Gibson) suggest that the relevant information specified in ambient optic array is the distal physical properties of objects. This specifying information reveals the action opportunities the environment affords. These affordances are directly perceivable without ambiguity, and thus preclude the need for internal models or representations of the world. Affordances exist only as a byproduct of the interactions between an agent and its environment, and thus perception is an "ecological" endeavor, depending on the whole agent/environment system rather than on the agent in isolation.

Because affordances are action possibilities, perception is directly connected to the production of actions and movements. The role of perception is to provide information that specifies how actions should be organized and controlled, and the motor system is "tuned" to respond to specific type of information in particular ways. Through this relationship, control of the motor system and the execution of actions is dictated by the information of the environment. As an example, a doorway "affords" passing through, but a wall does not. How one might pass through a doorway is specified by the visual information received from the environment, as well as the information perceived about one's own body. Together, this information determines the pass-ability of a doorway, but not a wall. In addition, the act of moving towards and passing through the doorway generates more information and this in turn specifies further action. The conclusion of direct perception is that actions and perceptions are critically linked and one cannot be fully understood without the other.

==== Behavioral dynamics ====
Building on the assumptions of direct perception behavioral dynamics is a behavioral control theory that treats perceptual organisms as dynamic systems that respond to informational variables with actions, in a functional manner. Under this understanding of behavior, actions unfold as the natural consequence of the interaction between the organisms and the available information about the environment, which specified in body-relevant variables. Much of the research in behavioral dynamics has focused on locomotion, where visually specified information (such as optic flow, time-to-contact, optical expansion, etc.) is used to determine how to navigate the environment Interaction forces between the human and the environment also affect behavioral dynamics as seen in by the Neural control of limb stiffness.

== Planning in motor control ==
=== Individual movement optimization ===
There are several mathematical models that describe how the central nervous system (CNS) derives reaching movements of limbs and eyes. The minimum jerk model states that the CNS minimizes jerk of a limb endpoint trajectory over the time of reaching, which results in a smooth trajectory. However, this model is based solely on the kinematics of movement and does not consider the underlying dynamics of the musculoskeletal system. Hence, the minimum torque-change model was introduced as an alternative, where the CNS minimizes the joint torque change over the time of reaching.

Later it was argued that there is no clear explanation about how could the CNS actually estimate complex quantities such as jerk or torque change and then integrate them over the duration of a trajectory. In response, model based on signal-dependent noise was proposed instead, which states that the CNS selects a trajectory by minimizing the variance of the final position of the limb endpoint. Since there is a motor noise in the neural system that is proportional to the activation of the muscles, the faster movements induce more motor noise and are thus less precise. This is also in line with the Fitts' Law and speed-accuracy trade-off. Optimal control theory was used to further extend the model based on signal-dependent noise, where the CNS optimizes an objective function that consists of a term related to accuracy and additionally a term related to metabolic cost of movement.

Another type of models is based on cost-benefit trade-off, where the objective function includes metabolic cost of movement and a subjective reward related to reaching the target accurately. In this case the reward for a successful reach within the desired target is discounted by the duration of reaching, since the gained reward is perceived less valuable when spending more time on it. However, these models were deterministic and did not account for motor noise, which is an essential property of stochastic motor control that results in speed-accuracy trade-off. To address that, a new model was later proposed to incorporate the motor noise and to unify cost-benefit and speed-accuracy trade-offs.

=== Multi-component movements ===
Some studies observed that the CNS can split a complex movement into sub-movements. The initial sub-movement tends to be fast and imprecise in order to bring the limb endpoint into vicinity of the target as soon as possible. Then, the final sub-movement tends to be slow and precise in order to correct for accumulated error by the first initial sub-movement and to successfully reach the target. A later study further explored how the CNS selects a temporary target of the initial sub-movement in different conditions. For example, when the actual target size decreases and thus complexity increases, the temporary target of the initial sub-movement moves away from the actual target in order to give more space for the final corrective action. Longer reaching distances have a similar effect, since more error is accumulated in the initial sub-movement and thus requiring more complex final correction. In less complex conditions, when the final actual target is large and the movement is short, the CNS tends to use a single movement, without splitting it into multiple competents.

== See also ==
- Motor learning
- Motor skill
- Motor coordination
- Motor cortex
- Multisensory integration
- Proprioception
- Sensory processing
- Sensory-motor coupling
- Two-alternative forced choice
- Psychomotor learning
