= Myoclonic triangle =

Motor feedback circuit of the brainstem

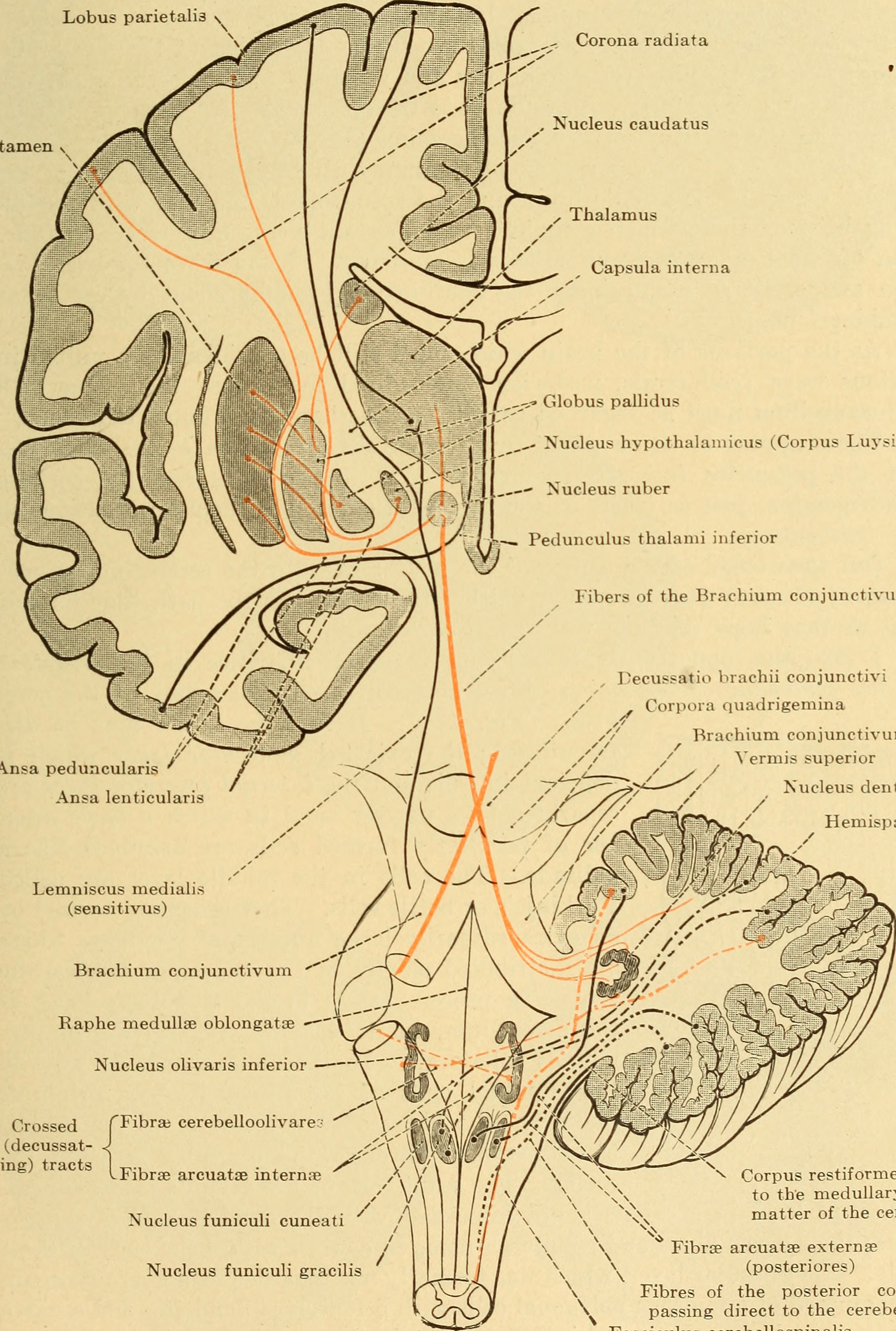
Labeled diagram showing some of the cerebellar neural tracts. Only the nucleus ruber and the dentate nucleus are shown in this diagram; the olivary nucleus is positioned on the lateral aspect of the brainstem.

The myoclonic triangle (also known by its eponym Triangle of Guillain-Mollaret or dentato-rubro-olivary pathway) is an important feedback circuit of the brainstem and deep cerebellar nuclei which is responsible for modulating spinal cord motor activity.

The circuit is thus composed:

1. Fibers of the rubro-olivary tract project from the parvocellular red nucleus via the central tegmental tract to the ipsilateral inferior olivary nucleus.
2. The inferior olivary nucleus sends its afferents via climbing fibers in the inferior cerebellar peduncle to Purkinje cells of the contralateral cerebellar cortex.
3. The Purkinje cells send their afferents to the ipsilateral dentate nucleus.
4. Dentatorubral tract fibers: the dentate nucleus afferents travel via the superior cerebellar peduncle to the contralateral red nucleus, thus completing the circuit.

Of note, this circuit contains a double decussation, implying that a lesion in this tract will cause ipsilateral symptoms.

The descending rubrospinal tract and reticulospinal tract originate in the red nucleus and reticular formation (which is closely associated with the central tegmental tract) respectively, thereby providing the mechanism by which this circuit exerts its effects on spinal cord motor activity.

== Pathologies ==
=== Hypertrophic olivary degeneration ===
Palatal myoclonus

HOD is caused by lesions in the dentatorubral or central tegmental tracts. Lesions of the superior cerebellar peduncle can also result in contralateral HOD, whereas primary lesions of the central tegmental tract cause ipsilateral HOD. Lesions involving this circuit may produce palatal myoclonus, one of the few involuntary movements that do not disappear during sleep. Palatal myoclonus may be seen as a component of the lateral medullary syndrome (a.k.a. Wallenberg Syndrome), if the infarction extends to involve the central tegmental tract.

==== Holmes tremor ====
Descriptions of Holmes tremor associated with HOD are scarce. It is most likely that disruption of the disynaptic dentate-rubro-olivary tract degeneration is associated with tremor and disruption of the monosynaptic dentate-olivary tract is associated with HOD. The convergence of both components makes the combination of Holmes tremor and HOD after upper brainstem damage plausible and even likely.
