= Gabrielle Charlotte Lévy =

French neurologist (1886–1934)

Gabrielle Lévy
- Born: 11 January 1886; Paris, France
- Died: 6 October 1934 (aged 48)
- Known for: Roussy-Lévy syndrome, Lhermitte-Lévy syndrome
- Scientific career
- Fields: Neurology, neuro-oncology, neuropathology
- Thesis: Contributions à l'étude des manifestations tardives de l'encéphalite épidémique (1922)
- Academic advisors: Pierre Marie, Gustave Roussy, Jean Lhermitte

Gabrielle Charlotte Lévy (11 January 1886 – 6 October 1934) was a French neurologist, for whose work the Roussy–Lévy syndrome and the Lhermitte-Lévy syndrome are named. She also made significant contributions to the understanding of encephalitis lethargica.

== Early life and education ==
Lévy was born in Paris on 11 January 1886 to Mina Marie Lang (1851–1903) and Emile Gustave Lévy (1844–1912), who was in the textile business. She was the last of five children, and the only girl. As a child, she had many interests including music, but chose to study medicine. An obituary published in the Journal of Nervous and Mental Disease describes her as having "qualities of intense application and of intelligence."

Lévy started her externat in Paris in 1911. Between 1912 and 1915, she worked at the surgical department of La Pitié Hospital, with Paul Oulmont at Hôpital Beaujon, with Antoine Marfan at the Hôpital des Enfants-Malades, and again at La Pitié Hospital with Professor Enrique. She then worked for three years with Pierre Marie at the Salpêtrière, then completed her internship between 1918 and 1919. At the Salpêtrière, Lévy also acted as Marie's chief of laboratory (1920–1922), and later assistant at the pathology department (1923–1926).

In 1925, at the age of 39, she was named associated physician at the Paul-Brousse Hospital. She became a full attending physician shortly before her death.

== Research interests ==
Lévy was known professionally for her scientific rigour, her passion for neuropathology, and her perseverance. During her career, Lévy focused on two main areas of research: encephalitis lethargica, and the Roussy–Lévy syndrome, which was named for her. However, she also worked on Lhermitte symptom and the Lhermitte-Lévy syndrome, the neurology of war, movement disorders including palatal myoclonus, brain tumours, and disorders associated with higher cortical functions such as palilalia.

According to her obituary, "her investigations brought out much entirely new material." Gustave Roussy also praised her work for its originality. Though she is rarely cited as first-author in the publications to which she contributed, Roussy credited her with many of the initial ideas for projects, and a great part of their execution, describing her role in the research as "dominant".

=== Encephalitis lethargica ===
Lévy's first article was a collaboration with Pierre Marie describing 10 cases of movement disorders associated with encephalitis lethargica. She subsequently published another 13 articles on the subject of postencephalitic syndromes, culminating in her 314-page thesis, published in 1922 and titled "Contributions à l'étude des manifestations tardives de l'encéphalite épidémique". Her thesis was based on the personal study of 129 cases from the Salpêtrière hospital, and contained over 700 references. It was reviewed by Eduard Feindel, who described it as rich in facts and original ideas. Her thesis was later published as a book, Les manifestations tardives de l'enchéphalite épidémique (1925). According to her obituary, "her contributions to rare syndromes of this disorder have been of the highest order," and her thesis in particular "gave her a commanding place in the neuropsychiatric world."

=== Roussy-Lévy syndrome ===
In 1926, in collaboration with her colleague Roussy, she published an article describing seven patients with hereditary areflexive dystasia, which then became known as Roussy-Lévy syndrome. It is a disease of the peripheral nervous system, caused by a mutation in one of two myelin genes. Roussy and Lévy published follow-up work on their first paper in 1934.

=== Lhermitte-Lévy syndrome ===
Lévy collaborated with Jean Lhermitte on peduncular hallucinatory syndromes. The Lhermitte-Lévy syndrome, a progressive post-stroke paralysis, was named for their work.

=== Other interests ===
During the First World War, the Pitié-Salpêtrière Hospital became a military neurological centre. Lévy became interested in the neurology of war, and wrote several articles on war injuries she observed in the hospital.

Throughout her career, Lévy published several articles on movement disorders, describing cases of rhythmic myoclonus of the palate muscles (also known as palatal nystagmus or palatal myoclonus), athetosis, and choreic movement disorders. According to Gustave Roussy, Lévy's work on palatal myoclonus was particularly influential.

In addition, Roussy was mainly an oncologist, so under his direction, Lévy wrote several reviews on neuro-oncology. She collaborated with both Roussy and Simone Laborde on the use of radiotherapy for cerebral tumours.

== Personal life ==
Lévy had to choose between marriage and career, reportedly declining a proposal from an ophthalmologist because she did not want to abandon her work. In the obituary written by Gustave Roussy, he explains that "circumstances made her work, research and the exercise of her profession her raison d'être". He further praises the numerous qualities she possessed: "In all her work, we find the mark of her personality: the method in the rigorous observation of the facts, the determination to pursue the analysis and the repeated verification of a sign or a lesion that may have seemed unusual or new to her, the curiosity to go back to the origins of this sign in order to find its logical and rational explanation, the patience to frequently compare what she saw with what others had noted before her, finally the taste to debate - as she liked to call them - with her contradictors, the validity of her assertions, and in this dialectic in which she excelled, she was served by a great memory and a perfect knowledge of foreign languages."

Lévy died on 6 October 1934, at the age of 48, in the middle of reviewing a new article on Roussy–Lévy syndrome. She suffered from a severe disease of the nervous system, which she diagnosed herself, but she remained lucid until the end. Though her family believed that her death was caused by the very disease she was studying, the real cause of her death is uncertain.

== Bibliography ==
- Les manifestations tardives de l'encéphalite épidémique (1925)
