= Holmes tremor =

Upper-body sign of cerebellar damage

Holmes tremor, first identified by Gordon Holmes in 1904, can be described as a wing-beating movement localized in the upper body that is caused by cerebellar damage. Holmes tremor is a combination of rest, action, and postural tremors. Tremor frequency ranges from 2 to 5 Hertz and is aggravated with posture and movement. It may arise from various underlying structural disorders including stroke, tumors, trauma, and other cerebellar lesions. Because Holmes tremor is rare, much of the research is based on individual cases.

The formation of tremors is due to two main factors: the over-excited rhythmic movement of neuronal loops and permanent structural changes from neurodegeneration. Two major neuronal networks, the corticostriatothalamocortical hap and the inferior olivary nucleus (ION) specifically target the development of the tremors. When diagnosing a patient with Holmes tremor, one must look at the neurological signs and symptoms, as well as the possibility that the tremor is caused by medications or other stimulants. In most cases, the patient's history and a targeted neurological examination is enough to give a diagnosis.

Treatment for Holmes tremor is dependent on the characteristics of the tremor. Because the disease is involved with the dopaminergic system, most treatments involve levodopa. Drugs used to treat other types of tremors are applicable to the treatment of Holmes tremor; however, these drugs have a low success rate.

== Signs and symptoms ==
Holmes tremor is typically characterized by a low frequency tremor (below 4.5 Hz) that has a repeated series of rest and intention tremors. These tremors move slowly and are generally specific to an upper area of the body. They can consist of postural tremors in nearby muscles as well. These tremors involve uncontrollable shaking despite efforts to be still. Holmes tremor is considered a rest-intention posture tremor. These irregular movements occur while muscles are at rest, but worsen during voluntary muscle contractions. Symptoms usually appear delayed one to twenty-four months after the lesion is created.

== Causes ==
=== Risk factors ===
Risk factors for Holmes tremor include excess exposure to heavy metals, such as mercury and lead, as well as an increased intake of various drugs and toxins. Researchers found that raising the dose of antidepressants or neuroleptics elevate the risk for developing Holmes tremor. Increasing intake of coffee, tea, or other stimulants can also cause for greater risk of development. Tremors depend on dosage and amount of exposure to these factors and will typically decrease dramatically if the intake is reduced. Hyperthyroidism and hyperglycemia also increase the likelihood of developing Holmes tremor.

=== Triggers ===
Similar to the causes of most tremors, Holmes tremor is triggered by lesion damage to a circuit controlling a physiological task such as precision movements, motor learning, the control of muscle groups, etc. Holmes tremor specifically occurs as a delayed reaction to lesion damage of the dopaminergic and cerebellothalamic systems. The most common cause of this lesion damage is brainstem stroke and trauma. The lesion damage to the dopamine pathways is associated with the neurological signs and symptoms.

=== Genetics/Genome ===
Because brainstem stroke and lesions are typically the causes of Holmes tremor, there is little research supporting a genetic factor to the disease. However, one could be more susceptible to developing Holmes tremor if there is a familial history of stroke, substance abuse, or other disorders that increase risk.

== Mechanism ==
The pathophysiology of a tremor is not completely understood, but what is understood can be explained by two principles. First, the complete absence of structural changes in the neuronal loops results in hyperexcitability and rhythmic movement. Second, is the permanent structural neurodegeneration. The corticostriatothalamocortical hap is a neuronal network that is associated with the integration of different muscle groups. It activates complex movement programs and guarantees continuous movement that cannot be terminated by small external influences. Another important circuit involving Holmes tremor is the Guillain-Mollaret Triangle, which includes the red nucleus, the inferior olivary nucleus (ION), and the dentate nucleus. This circuit controls voluntary precision movements. The ION is the most important of these components in the formation of tremors. In normal/healthy individuals' ION neurons, calcium channels regulate normal oscillatory depolarizations. This pacemaker affects processing and coordination of cerebellar precision movements and motor learning. Damages, both physical and chemical, to the ION affects the Guillain-Mollaret Triangle and leads to tremors.

== Diagnosis ==
The physical characteristics of the tremor and the history of the patient will contribute to the diagnosis of Holmes tremor. A doctor will determine if the tremor is present during rest or voluntary muscle contraction and the frequency of the tremor. A Holmes tremor is generally made worse upon standing and upon intentional movements. Also, a Holmes tremor is not as rhythmic as other tremors.

To confirm the diagnosis of a Holmes tremor, a doctor will usually perform ancillary examinations. This includes measuring serum thyroid stimulating hormone levels to ensure the thyroid is functioning normally. This rules out the possibility hyperthyroidism is causing a different type of tremor. An MRI can also be performed to look for structural lesions in areas such as the thalamus, midbrain tegmentum, and substantia nigra.

== Treatment ==
Treatment of a Holmes tremor can fail or is delayed because there are only a few diagnostic tools available. The treatment of choice is complete removal of the tumor. Removing the tumor can result in elimination or better control of the tremors. Other treatment options involve coping strategies such as avoiding movements or actions that worsen tremors. Patients with Holmes tremors can also benefit from using larger utensil handles and wrist weights. There are also some pharmacological treatments, but they are not very effective.

== Alternative names ==
- Rubral tremor - the name intended to mean "tremor related to the red nucleus of the midbrain", but is no longer used because Holmes tremor can arise from lesions located in other areas
