= Central tegmental tract =

Nerve tract in the midbrain and pons

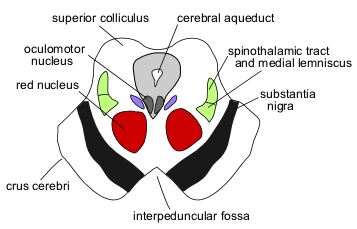
- Diagram of the midbrain, sectioned at the level of the superior colliculus (Central tegmental tract not labeled, but region is visible.)

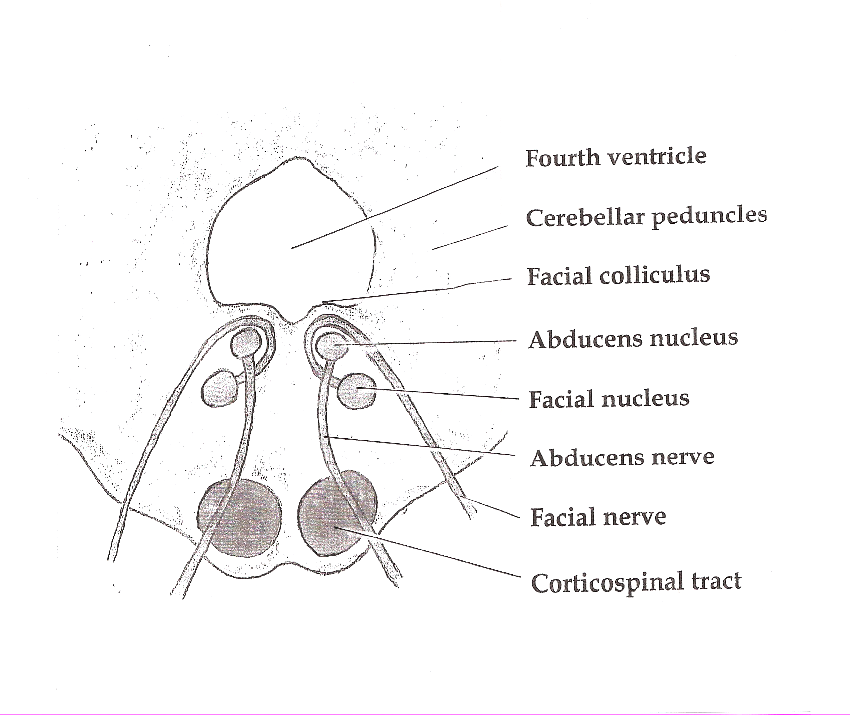
- Axial section of the Brainstem (Pons) at the level of the Facial Colliculus (Central tegmental tract not labeled, but region is visible.)

Details

Identifiers
- Latin: Tractus tegmentalis centralis
- NeuroNames: 2204
- TA98: A14.1.05.325
- TA2: 5869
- FMA: 83850

The central tegmental tract is a tract that carries ascending and descending fibers, situated in the midbrain tegmentum, and the pontine tegmentum. The tract is situated in the central portion of the reticular formation.

== Structure ==
The central tegmental tract contains descending and ascending fibers. It runs from the red nucleus to the inferior olivary nucleus. In humans it is very small and runs ventral to the lateral corticospinal tract.

=== Descending fibers ===
Descending fibers of the rubro-olivary tract project from the parvocellular red nucleus to the ipsilateral inferior olivary nucleus. The inferior olivary nucleus projects to the contralateral cerebellum via olivocerebellar fibers. The rubro-olivary fibres descend through the superior cerebellar peduncle.

=== Ascending fibers ===
Ascending fibers are second-order axons projecting from the gustatory nucleus (the rostral part of the solitary nucleus] to the ventral posteromedial nucleus of thalamus (third-order neurons in turn project to the gustatory cortex).

Ascending reticulothalamic fibres project from the medial zone nuclei of the reticular formation to the hypothalamus (to mediate autonomic nervous system response), and the intralaminar thalamic nuclei (to mediate a startle response to pain).

== Clinical significance ==
Lesion of the tract can cause palatal myoclonus, e.g. in myoclonic syndrome, in strokes of the posterior inferior cerebellar artery.

== Additional Images ==
Horizontal section through the lower part of the pons. The central tegmental tract is labeled #16.

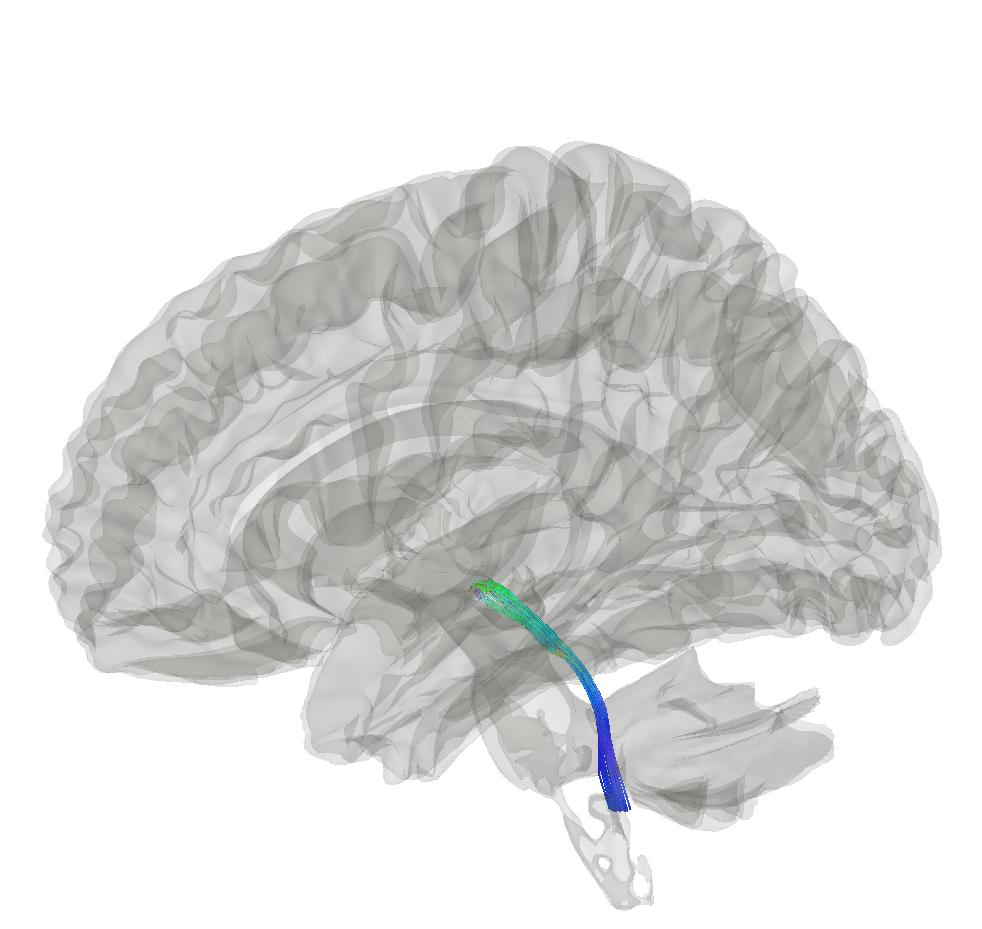
Tractography showing central tegmental tract
