= IETF (disambiguation) =

IETF is the Internet Engineering Task Force, an organization developing Internet standards.

IETF may also refer to:

- International Essential Tremor Foundation, an organization supporting people with Essential tremors.
- Industrial Energy Transformation Fund, a funding program of the UK Department for Business, Energy and Industrial Strategy
