= Magnocellular =

Magnocellular may refer to:

- Magnocellular cell, part of visual system
- Magnocellular red nucleus
- Magnocellular neurosecretory cell
- Magnocellular pathway
- Magnocellular theory of dyslexia
