= Dejerine–Roussy syndrome =

- Other names: Thalamic pain syndrome, Central post-stroke pain syndrome
- Specialty: Neurology

Dejerine–Roussy syndrome or thalamic pain syndrome is a condition developed after a thalamic stroke, a stroke causing damage to the thalamus. Ischemic strokes and hemorrhagic strokes can cause lesioning in the thalamus. As initial stroke symptoms (numbness and tingling) dissipate, an imbalance in sensation causes these later syndromes, characterizing Dejerine–Roussy syndrome. Although some treatments exist, they are often expensive, chemically based, invasive, and only treat patients for some time before they need more treatment, called "refractory treatment".

== Symptoms and signs ==
Dejerine–Roussy syndrome is most commonly preceded by numbness in the affected side. In these cases, numbness is replaced by burning and tingling sensations, widely varying in degree of severity across all cases. The majority of those reported are cases in which the symptoms are severe and debilitating. Burning and tingling can also be accompanied by hypersensitivity, usually in the form of dysaesthesia or allodynia. Less commonly, some patients develop severe ongoing pain with little or no stimuli.

Allodynia is pain from a stimulus that would normally not cause pain. An example would be a patient who experiences unrelenting pain when a breeze touches his skin. Most patients experiencing allodynia, experience pain with touch and pressure, however some can be hypersensitive to temperature.

Dysaesthesia is defined as an unpleasant, abnormal sense of touch. It often presents as pain. In this condition it is due to thalamic lesioning. This form of neuropathic pain can be any combination of itching, tingling, burning, or searing experienced spontaneously or from stimuli.

Allodynia and dysaesthesia replace numbness between one week and a few months after a thalamic stroke. In general, once the development of pain has stopped, the type and severity of pain will be unchanging and if untreated, persist throughout life. Consequentially, many will undergo some form of pain treatment and adjust to their new lives as best they can.

Pain associated with Dejerine–Roussy syndrome is sometimes coupled with anosognosia or somatoparaphrenia which causes a patient having undergone a right-parietal, or right-sided stroke to deny any paralysis of the left side when indeed there is, or deny the paralyzed limb(s) belong to them. Although debatable, these symptoms are rare and considered part of a "thalamic phenomenon", and are not normally considered a characteristic of Dejerine–Roussy syndrome.

== Mechanism ==
Although there are many contributing factors and risks associated with strokes, there are very few associated with Dejerine–Roussy syndrome and thalamic lesions specifically. In general, strokes damage one hemisphere of the brain, which can include the thalamus. The thalamus is generally believed to relay sensory information between a variety of subcortical areas and the cerebral cortex. It is known that sensory information from environmental stimuli travels to the thalamus for processing and then to the somatosensory cortex for interpretation. The final product of this communication is the ability to see, hear or feel something as interpreted by the brain. Dejerine–Roussy syndrome most often compromises tactile sensation. Therefore, the damage in the thalamus causes miscommunication between the afferent pathway and the cortex of the brain, changing what or how one feels. The change could be an incorrect sensation experienced, or inappropriate amplification or dulling of a sensation. Because the brain is considered plastic and each individual's brain is different, it is almost impossible to know how a sensation will be changed without brain mapping and individual consultation.

Recently, magnetic resonance imaging has been utilized to correlate lesion size and location with area affected and severity of condition. Although preliminary, these findings hold promise for an objective way to understand and treat patients with Dejerine–Roussy syndrome.

== Diagnosis ==
Dejerine-Roussy is a rare pain syndrome. Individuals with emerging Dejerine–Roussy syndrome usually report they are experiencing unusual pain or sensitivity that can be allodynic in nature or triggered by seemingly unrelated stimuli (sounds, tastes). Symptoms are typically lateralized and may include vision loss or loss of balance (position sense). Workup should be performed by a neurologist and brain imaging to look for evidence of infarction or tumor should be obtained.

== Treatments ==
Many chemical medications have been used for a broad range of neuropathic pain including Dejerine–Roussy syndrome. Symptoms are generally not treatable with ordinary analgesics. Traditional chemicals include opiates and anti-depressants. Newer pharmaceuticals include anti-convulsants and Kampo medicine. As there is no scientific basis in the analgesic efficacy of Kampo medicine beyond placebo, mainstream methods are preferred. Pain treatments are most commonly administered via oral medication or periodic injections. Topical In addition, physical therapy has traditionally been used alongside a medication regimen. More recently, electrical stimulation of the brain and spinal cord and caloric stimulation have been explored as treatments.

The most common treatment plans involve a schedule of physical therapy with a medication regimen. Because the pain is mostly unchanging after development, many patients test different medications and eventually choose the regimen that best adapts to their lifestyle, the most common of which are orally and intravenously administered.

=== Pharmaceutical treatment ===
- Opiates contain the narcotics morphine, codeine, and papaverine which provide pain relief. Opiates activate μ-opioid receptors in the brain which alter the brain's perception of sensory input, alleviating pain and sometimes inducing pleasure for a short time period. When intravenously administered, opiates can relieve neuropathic pain but only for a time between 4 and 24 hours. After this time window, the pain returns and the patient must be treated again. Although this method of treatment has been proven to reduce pain, the repetitive use of opiates has also been linked to the activation of the brain's reward system and therefore poses a threat of addiction. Heavy doses of opiates can also cause constipation, and respiratory depression. More common side effects include light-headedness, dizziness, sedation, itching, nausea, vomiting, and sweating.
- Anti-depressants are traditionally administered for treatment of mood disorders, also linked to the thalamus, and can be used to treat Dejerine–Roussy symptoms. Specifically, tricyclic anti-depressants such as amitriptyline and selective serotonin reuptake inhibitors have been used to treat this symptom and they are effective to some degree within a short time window.
- Anti-convulsants reduce neuronal hyperexcitability, effectively targeting Dejerine–Roussy syndrome. Gabapentin and pregabalin are the most common anti-convulsants. They have significant efficacy in treatment of peripheral and central neuropathic pain. Treatments last 4–12 hours and in general are well tolerated, and the occurrence of adverse events does not differ significantly across patients. Commonly reported side-effects are dizziness, decreased intellectual performance, somnolence, and nausea.
- Topical treatment such as lidocaine patches can be used to treat pain locally.

=== Stimulation treatments ===
- Electrode stimulation from surgically implanted electrodes has been studied in the past decade in hopes of a permanent pain treatment without refraction. Electric stimulation utilizing implants deliver specific voltages to a specific part of the brain for specific durations. More recently, research is being done in radiation therapy as long-term treatment of Dejerine–Roussy syndrome. In general, these studies have concluded initial efficacy in such implants, but pain often re-appears after a year or so. Long-term efficacy of stimulation treatments must be further tested and evaluated.

Expensive and invasive, the above treatments are not guaranteed to work, and are not meeting the needs of patients. There is a need for a new, less expensive, less invasive form of treatment, two of which are postulated below.

- Spinal cord stimulation has been studied in the last couple of years. In a long case study, 8 patients were given spinal cord stimulation via insertion of a percutaneous lead at the appropriate level of the cervical or thoracic spine. Between 36 and 149 months after the stimulations, the patients were interviewed. 6 of the 8 had received initial pain relief, and three experienced long-term pain relief. Spinal cord stimulation is cheaper than brain stimulation and less invasive, and is thus a more promising option for pain treatment.

== Epidemiology ==
8% of all stroke patients will experience central pain syndrome, with 5% experiencing moderate to severe pain. The risk of developing Dejerine–Roussy syndrome is higher in older stroke patients, about 11% of stroke patients over the age of 80.

== History ==
In 1906, Joseph Jules Dejerine and Gustave Roussy provided descriptions of central post-stroke pain (CPSP) in their paper entitled: "Le syndrome thalamique". The name Dejerine–Roussy syndrome was coined after their deaths. The syndrome included "…severe, persistent, paroxysmal, often intolerable, pains on the hemiplegic side, not yielding to any analgesic treatment".

In 1911, it was found that the patients often developed pain and hypersensitivity to stimuli during recovery of function. And thus it was thought that the pain associated after stroke was part of the stroke and lesion repair process occurring in the brain. It is now accepted that Dejerine–Roussy syndrome is a condition developed due to lesions interfering with the sensory process, which triggered the start of pharmaceutical and stimulation treatment research. The last 50 years have been filled with refractory treatment research. As of the early 2000s, longer treatments lasting months to years have been explored in the continued search for permanent removal of abnormal pain.

== Eponym ==
Dejerine–Roussy syndrome has also been referred to as: "Posterior Thalamic Syndrome", "Retrolenticular Syndrome", "Thalamic Hyperesthetic Anesthesia", "Thalamic Pain Syndrome", "Thalamic Syndrome", "Central Pain Syndrome", and "Central Post-Stroke Syndrome". This condition is not associated with Roussy–Lévy syndrome or Dejerine–Sottas disease, both of which are genetic disorders.

== See also ==
- Central pain syndrome
