= Gustave Roussy =

Swiss French neuroscientist

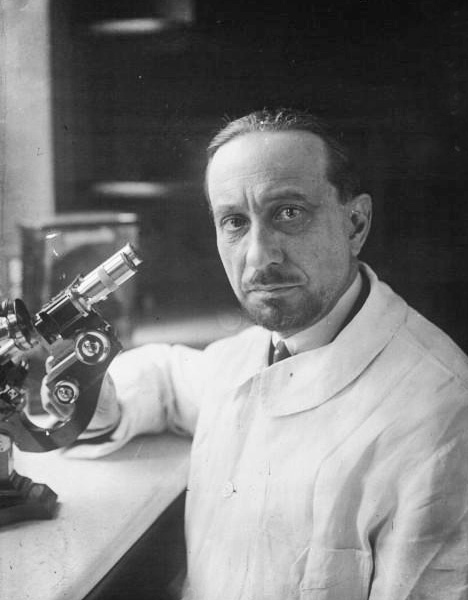
Gustave Roussy (1927)

Gustave Roussy (French pronunciation: [ɡystav ʁusi]; 24 November 1874 – 30 September 1948) was a Swiss-French neuropathologist born in Vevey, Switzerland.

== Career ==
As a hospital interne in Paris, Roussy worked under neurologists Pierre Marie and Joseph Jules Dejerine. In 1907 he earned his doctorate from the University of Paris, and in 1925 was appointed professor of pathological anatomy at the Faculté de Médecine. Later on, he was named dean (1933) and rector (1937) to the faculty of medicine at the university.

Roussy made several contributions in the field of neurology, in particular, his investigations on the role of the thalamus and the autonomic nervous system.

During World War I he was chief of neurology of the 7th Military Region Besançon, publishing extensively on his experiences with battle-related wounds. He was the author or co-author of a number of works on psychological and neuropsychological issues as a consequence of war.

In 1926, in collaboration with his colleague Gabrielle Charlotte Lévy, he published an article describing seven patients with hereditary areflexive dystasia, which then became known as Roussy-Lévy syndrome. It is a disease of the peripheral nervous system, caused by a mutation in one of two myelin genes. Roussy and Lévy published follow-up work on their first paper in 1934.

In 1946 he published a 1000-page monograph titled "Traité de Neuroendocronologie" in regards to his research in the field of neuroendocrinology. With Jean Camus (1872–1924) he performed important studies involving damage to the hypothalamus.

Roussy was interested in the study and treatment of cancer, becoming director of the Institut du Cancer in 1930. Today in the Parisian suburb of Villejuif is the Institute Gustave-Roussy, a private institution devoted to oncology.

In 1948, Roussy killed himself by cutting in his Paris home.

== Eponyms ==
Along with other physicians are three eponymous disorders named after him:

- "Darier-Roussy sarcoid": an uncommon subcutaneous granuloma found in sarcoidosis. Named with Ferdinand-Jean Darier.
- "Dejerine-Roussy syndrome": a syndrome caused by lesions of the posterior thalamus. It occurs in approximately 2% of all stroke patients. Named with Joseph Jules Dejerine.
- "Roussy-Lévy disease": spinocerebellar degeneration with muscular atrophy of the lower limbs, sensory ataxia, plus other symptoms. A hereditary disease that is usually first noticed in infancy. Named with Dr. Gabrielle Lévy.

== Selected writings ==
- Les psychonévroses de guerre, with Jacques Jean Lhermitte (1917), later translated into English.
- Travaux pratiques d’anatomie pathologique en quatorze séances de lectures de coupes microscopiques, with Ivan Bertrand (1893–1965), Preface by Pierre Marie (1917), later translated into English.
- Les blessures de la moëlle et de la queue de cheval, with Jacques Jean Lhermitte (1918).
- Traitement des psychonévroses de guerre, with J. Boisseau and M. d’Oelsnitz (1919).
- A propos de la dystasie areflexique héréditaire, with Gabrielle Lévy. Revue neurologique, Paris, 1934, 62: 763.
- Traité de Neuroendocrinologie (1946).
