= Ulixacaltamide =

Investigational medication for essential tremor

Ulixacaltamide INN: Ulixacaltamide

Clinical data
- Other names: PRAX-944; Z-944
- Routes of administration: By mouth; transdermal patch (investigational)
- Drug class: T-type calcium channel blocker

Legal status
- Legal status: US: Investigational (Breakthrough Therapy); Investigational

Identifiers
- IUPAC name: N-[[1-[2-(tert-Butylamino)-2-oxoethyl]piperidin-4-yl]methyl]-3-chloro-5-fluorobenzamide
- CAS Number: 1199236-64-0
- PubChem CID: 44540045
- DrugBank: DB18788
- ChemSpider: 29788896
- UNII: QT2PJH89C3
- KEGG: D12819
- ChEBI: CHEBI:194339
- ChEMBL: ChEMBL3934636

Chemical and physical data
- Formula: C_{19}H_{27}ClFN_{3}O_{2}
- Molar mass: 383.89 g·mol^{−1}
- 3D model (JSmol): Interactive image
- SMILES: CC(C)(C)NC(=O)CN1CCC(CC1)CNC(=O)C2=CC(=CC(=C2)Cl)F
- InChI: InChI=1S/C19H27ClFN3O2/c1-19(2,3)23-17(25)12-24-6-4-13(5-7-24)11-22-18(26)14-8-15(20)10-16(21)9-14/h8-10,13H,4-7,11-12H2,1-3H3,(H,22,26)(H,23,25); Key:JOCLITFYIMJMNK-UHFFFAOYSA-N

Ulixacaltamide (developmental codes PRAX-944 and Z-944) is an investigational new drug developed by Praxis Precision Medicines for the treatment of essential tremor (ET). It is a small molecule designed to selectively inhibit T-type calcium channels, reducing the abnormal neuronal burst firing in the cerebello-thalamo-cortical (CTC) circuit that is believed to cause tremors.

In October 2025, the drug met the primary endpoints of both pivotal studies in the Phase 3 Essential3 clinical program, which Praxis has described as the first positive Phase 3 program in essential tremor. Following these results, the U.S. Food and Drug Administration (FDA) granted ulixacaltamide Breakthrough Therapy Designation in December 2025. In February 2026, the company submitted a New Drug Application (NDA) to the FDA, which was accepted for review in April 2026 with a target action date of January 2027.

== Medical uses ==
Ulixacaltamide is being developed specifically for the treatment of essential tremor in adults. If approved, it would represent a new pharmacological class of treatment for the condition, distinct from the current standard-of-care agents such as propranolol (a beta-blocker) and primidone (an anticonvulsant), both of which were originally developed for other indications.

In December 2025, the FDA granted the drug Breakthrough Therapy Designation, a status intended to expedite the development and review of drugs for serious conditions where preliminary clinical evidence indicates the drug may demonstrate substantial improvement over available therapies. According to Praxis, the designation was granted on the basis of the topline results of the placebo-controlled Essential3 Phase 3 program.

== Mechanism of action ==
Ulixacaltamide is a selective blocker of T-type calcium channels (Cav3.1, Cav3.2, and Cav3.3 isoforms).

Research suggests that the involuntary rhythmic shaking characteristic of essential tremor is driven by abnormal oscillatory activity within the cerebello-thalamo-cortical circuit. Specifically, T-type calcium channels play a key role in generating "burst firing" patterns in neurons within this pathway. By inhibiting these channels, ulixacaltamide is designed to suppress this pathological burst firing and reduce tremor amplitude without causing the widespread central nervous system depression often associated with non-selective treatments.

== History ==
=== Discovery and early development ===
The compound was originally discovered by Zalicus Inc. (formerly Neuromed) and was known as Z-944, and was initially characterized in preclinical models of absence seizures, where it attenuated thalamic burst firing. It was later acquired by Praxis Precision Medicines and renamed PRAX-944. In addition to essential tremor, the compound was at various points investigated as a non-dopaminergic treatment for the motor symptoms of Parkinson's disease.

=== Clinical trials ===
==== Phase 2 ====
A Phase 2a trial (PRAX-944-221; NCT05021978) in adults with essential tremor comprised an open-label dose-titration part followed by a randomized withdrawal part.

The Phase 2b dose-ranging "Essential1" study (PRAX-944-222; NCT05021991) randomized 132 adults to ulixacaltamide 60 mg, 100 mg, or placebo once daily. The study did not meet its primary endpoint: the improvement from baseline to day 56 in the modified Activities of Daily Living (mADL) score was numerically greater than placebo but did not reach statistical significance (p=0.126). Nominally significant improvements were reported for secondary endpoints including the TETRAS-ADL (p=0.026), Clinical Global Impression–Severity (CGI-S) and Patient Global Impression–Change (PGI-C) scores, and Praxis elected to advance the program to Phase 3. Following an end-of-Phase 2 meeting, the FDA accepted the 11-item modified Activities of Daily Living scale (mADL11) as the primary endpoint for the Phase 3 program and agreed on a single 60 mg dose.

==== Phase 3 (Essential3) ====
The Essential3 Phase 3 program (PRAX-944-321; NCT06087276) consisted of two simultaneously enrolled, decentralized, placebo-controlled studies conducted in the United States, to which participants were allocated in a 2:1 blinded randomization, together with a long-term open-label safety study. Both studies used once-daily oral ulixacaltamide 60 mg.

In February 2025, an Independent Data Monitoring Committee (IDMC) reviewing a planned interim analysis of Study 1 recommended that the study be stopped for futility, as the results were considered unlikely to meet the primary efficacy endpoint under the parameters of the pre-specified statistical model; the committee noted that assumptions underlying that model might have influenced the outcome and encouraged the exploration of alternative analysis methods. Citing the advanced state of enrollment in both studies, Praxis elected to continue the program to completion.

Topline results were announced in October 2025 and presented at the American Academy of Neurology (AAN) Annual Meeting in April 2026:

- Study 1 (parallel group): a 12-week randomized, double-blind, placebo-controlled trial enrolling 473 adults randomized 1:1. The study met its primary endpoint, a mean improvement from baseline in the mADL11 score at week 8 of 4.3 points in the ulixacaltamide arm (p<0.0001). All key secondary endpoints – rate of disease improvement over 12 weeks, PGI-C and CGI-S – were also statistically significant (p<0.001).
- Study 2 (stable-responder randomized withdrawal): 238 patients received ulixacaltamide for 8 weeks; those improving by at least 3 points on the mADL11 were re-randomized to continue ulixacaltamide or switch to placebo for a further 4 weeks. The study met its primary endpoint, the proportion of patients maintaining response, with 55% maintaining response on ulixacaltamide versus 33% on placebo (p=0.0369). The first key secondary endpoint, rate of disease improvement during the withdrawal phase, also favored ulixacaltamide (p=0.0042).

=== Regulatory history ===
Following the Phase 3 results and a pre-NDA meeting completed in December 2025, Praxis submitted a New Drug Application (NDA) for ulixacaltamide hydrochloride to the FDA in February 2026. On 14 April 2026, the FDA formally accepted the application for review and set a Prescription Drug User Fee Act (PDUFA) target action date of 29 January 2027, with no plans to hold an advisory committee meeting.

In August 2026, Praxis reported that the NDA's mid-cycle review meeting had been completed and that the FDA had identified no major safety or efficacy concerns to date, reiterating that no advisory committee meeting was planned. The company also reported that FDA Bioresearch Monitoring (BIMO) inspections relating to the application had been completed without the issuance of a Form FDA 483, and stated that it did not intend to communicate further regulatory updates before the PDUFA date.

=== Transdermal formulation ===
In July 2026, Praxis announced a collaboration with Remagine Labs to develop an iontophoretic transdermal patch formulation of ulixacaltamide. The patch is intended to provide continuous, multi-day dosing to reduce fluctuations in drug concentration associated with oral administration. A transdermal formulation could also serve as an alternative for patients who experience difficulty swallowing or gastrointestinal issues. According to the company, the formulation is intended to broaden the drug's addressable patient population and support the long-term commercial durability of the program.

== Adverse effects ==
In the Phase 3 Essential3 studies, once-daily ulixacaltamide was generally well tolerated over 12 weeks, with no deaths and no drug-related serious adverse events reported. Most adverse events occurred during the initial dose titration period, were mild to moderate in severity, and resolved quickly. The most common treatment-emergent adverse events (occurring in ≥10% of patients) included constipation, dizziness, euphoric mood, "brain fog" (cognitive disturbance), headache, paresthesia, and insomnia. Treatment discontinuations in the active group were primarily driven by adverse events, most commonly dizziness and brain fog.
