= Essential tremor =

Movement disorder that causes involuntary tremors

- Other names: Idiopathic tremor
- Archimedean spiral drawings by a man with a unilateral essential tremor. The spiral on the left was drawn by the subject using the left hand, and the one on the right using the right hand.
- Specialty: Neurology
- Usual onset: Any age, but typically after 40
- Causes: Unknown
- Risk factors: Family history, exposure to particular toxins
- Diagnostic method: Based on symptoms
- Differential diagnosis: Cerebellar tremor, dystonic tremor, multiple sclerosis, Parkinson's disease
- Treatment: Medications, surgery
- Medication: Beta blockers, primidone, anti-epileptics, topiramate, gabapentin, levetiracetam, benzodiazepines
- Frequency: Annual incidence of 23.7 per 100,000 (2010)

Essential tremor (ET), also called benign tremor, familial tremor, and idiopathic tremor, is a medical condition characterized by involuntary rhythmic contractions and relaxations (oscillations or twitching movements) of certain muscle groups in one or more body parts of unknown cause. It is typically symmetrical, and affects the arms, hands, or fingers; but sometimes involves the head, vocal cords, or other body parts. Essential tremor is either an action (intention) tremor—it intensifies when one tries to use the affected muscles during voluntary movements such as eating and writing—or it is a postural tremor, which occurs when holding arms outstretched and against gravity. This means that it is distinct from a resting tremor, such as that caused by Parkinson's disease, which is not correlated with movement. Unlike Parkinson's disease, essential tremor may worsen with action.

Essential tremor is a progressive neurological disorder, and the most common movement disorder. Though not life-threatening, it can certainly be debilitating. Its onset is usually between 40 and 50 years of age, but it can occur at any age. The cause is poorly understood. Diagnosis is made by observing the typical pattern of the tremor coupled with the exclusion of known causes of such a tremor. There is currently no medical test available to identify an essential tremor.

While essential tremor is distinct from Parkinson's disease, which causes a resting tremor, essential tremor is nevertheless sometimes misdiagnosed as Parkinson's disease. Some patients have been found to have both essential tremors and resting tremors.

Treatments for essential tremor include medications, typically given sequentially to determine which provides the most efficacy with the fewest side effects. Clostridium botulinum toxin (Botox) injections and ultrasound are also sometimes used for cases refractory to medications.

== Signs and symptoms ==
The tremors linked with essential tremor are generally action tremors, which means they occur during intentional movements rather than when the body is at rest.

In mild cases, ET can manifest as the inability to stop the tongue or hands from shaking, the ability to sing only in vibrato, and difficulty doing small, precise tasks such as threading a needle. Even simple tasks such as cutting in a straight line or using a ruler can range from difficult to impossible, depending on the severity of the condition. In disabling cases, ET can interfere with a person's activities of daily living, including feeding, dressing, and taking care of personal hygiene. Essential tremor generally presents as a rhythmic tremor (4–12 Hz) that occurs only when the affected muscle is exerting effort. Any sort of physical or mental stress tends to make the tremor worse.

The tremor may also occur in the head (neck), jaw, and voice, as well as other body regions, with the general pattern being that the tremor begins in the arms and then spreads to these other regions in some people. Women are more likely to develop the head tremor than are men, and it is also found to be more severe in women than men. In people with ET, the head tremor can be either vertical ("yes-yes") or horizontal ("no-no") and is typically accompanied by tremors in the hands or voice. Other types of tremor may also occur, including postural tremor of the outstretched arms, intention tremor of the arms, and rest tremor in the arms. In one study, men had more severe postural hand tremor when compared to women. Some people may have unsteadiness and problems with gait and balance. Abnormal tandem gait was more commonly observed in older ET people and those with more than 5 years of disease duration.

ET-related tremors do not occur during sleep, but people with ET sometimes complain of an especially coarse tremor upon awakening that becomes noticeably less coarse within the first few minutes of wakefulness. Tremor and disease activity can intensify in response to fatigue, strong emotions, low blood sugar, extreme cold and heat, caffeine, lithium salts, some antidepressants, stress, and other factors.

Parkinson's disease and parkinsonism can also occur simultaneously with ET. The degree of tremor, rigidity, and functional disability did not differ from patients with idiopathic Parkinson's disease. Hand tremor predominated (as it did in Parkinson's disease), and occurred in nearly all cases, followed by head tremor, voice tremor, neck, face, leg, tongue, and trunk tremor. Most other tremors occurred in association with hand tremor. More severe tremors, a lower sleep disorder frequency, and a similar prevalence of other non-motor symptoms also can occur. A non-motor feature such as hearing impairment has been shown to have higher prevalence in those with ET compared with those that are healthy or with Parkinson's. Cochlear pathologies which affect the inner ear are proposed as the potential cause, but there is still insufficient information regarding retrocochlear pathologies (affects central or neural nerve) and central auditory processing.

Walking difficulties in essential tremor are common. About half of patients have associated dystonia, including cervical dystonia, writer's cramp, spasmodic dysphonia, and cranial dystonia, and 20% of the patients had associated parkinsonism. Olfactory dysfunction (loss of sense of smell) is common in Parkinson's disease, and has also been reported to occur in patients with essential tremor. A number of patients with essential tremor also exhibit many of the same neuropsychiatric disturbances seen in idiopathic Parkinson's disease. The similarity in characteristics between parkinsonism and essential tremor can make it difficult to distinguish between the two at times.

Essential tremor with tremor onset after the age of 65 has been associated with mild cognitive impairment, as well as dementia, although the link between these conditions, if any, is still not understood. Familial cases of ET tend to present at younger ages, whereas older ages of onset are linked to faster progression of the disease.

Essential tremor has two tremor components, central and peripheral. These two tremor components were identified by measuring the tremor of ET patients once with no weights on their hands and then with 1-pound weights on their hands. The addition of the weights resulted in a tremor spectrum with two peaks, one that maintained the same frequency (the central tremor) and one that decreased in frequency (the peripheral tremor). Only with the addition of the weights was the peripheral tremor distinguishable from the central tremor.

The frequency of essential tremor is 4 to 12 Hz, depending on which body segment is affected. Previously, it was 4 to 11 Hz according to the American Family Physician on Classification of Tremors and Treatment Update. Proximal segments are affected at lower frequencies, and distal segments are affected at higher frequencies.

== Cause ==
Essential tremor was once thought to be a single disease state, however, research shows that there are multiple factors that are associated with causing essential tremor. This leads to the consideration that essential tremor is more akin to a family of diseases, due to the presence of both genetic (familial) and sporadic essential tremors. Currently, there are multiple main hypotheses behind essential tremor, being the degeneration of the cerebellum, inheriting the tremor, ingestion of toxins, or the presence of Lewy Bodies in the brainstem. However, post mortem studies showed that only a small number of patients had Lewy Bodies, and that it was more common for patients not to exhibit them.

Cerebellar

It is unknown how the degeneration of the cerebellum leads to essential tremor, however, it is hypothesized that it may be due to the loss of Purkinje cells, as they release gamma-aminobutyric acid (GABA), which is an inhibitory neurotransmitter meant to control the firing of neurons in the cerebellum. In certain essential tremor clinical studies which augment the GABA pathway, only some participants exhibited a reduction of tremor. Some patients have responded to alcohol, claiming alcohol has reduced the tremor, however the reduction is only short term. However, alcohol might only be beneficial for those with an impacted GABA pathway, and may not benefit patients who developed the tremor via other pathways.

=== Genetic ===
The main underlying cause of essential tremor is not clear, but many cases seem to be familial. About half of the cases are due to a genetic mutation and the pattern of inheritance is most consistent with autosomal dominant transmission, meaning patients with essential tremor have around a 50% chance to pass it on to their children. There are multiple gene mutations and presentations on various chromosomes that lead to essential tremor. These include genes present on chromosomes 1–3, 6, 11, and 16. Each presentation or mutation of different genes were associated with families from different regions. For example, presentation of a gene associated with essential tremor on chromosome 6 has been noted in North American families, while a Canadian family was noted with mutations in the fused in sarcoma/translated in liposarcoma (FUS/TLS) gene. Other mutations in genes such as the HTRA Serine Peptidase 2 (HTRA2) and the teneurin transmembrane protein 4 (TENM4), have been observed in a Turkish family and the Spanish population respectively. Recent post mortem studies have displayed alterations in the leucine-rich repeat and immunoglobulin-like domain-containing protein 1 (LINGO1) gene and GABA receptors in the cerebellum of people with essential tremor. HAPT1 mutations have also been linked to ET, as well as to Parkinson's disease, multiple system atrophy, and progressive supranuclear palsy.

=== Poisons and toxins ===
Some environmental poisons, including toxins, are also under active investigation, as they may play a role in the disease's cause. Exposure to heavy metals, specifically lead, has been associated with causation of ET. Lead is a heavy metal that can cross the central nervous system's (CNS) main line of defense, the blood–brain barrier, even increasing its permeability, allowing other harmful substances to access the CNS. This allows lead access to the CNS, permitting it to disturb processes that utilize calcium, including synaptic activity, and causes intracellular disruption, both of which may lead to irreversible damage to the CNS. This would include cerebellar damage which could cause ET. There are other poisons that work in a similar manner to lead such as other heavy metals like mercury and aluminum, as well as toxic chemicals like certain pesticides and alcohol. In particular, excessive alcohol consumption can worsen essential tremor due to damage to the cerebellum.

== Pathophysiology ==
Essential tremor is one of the most prevalent and poorly-understood neurological disorders. Clinical, physiological and imaging studies point to involvement of the cerebellum and/or cerebellothalamocortical circuits. The traditional model for essential tremor, the olivary hypothesis, suggests that ET is caused by abnormal electrical activity in the inferior olivary nucleus. This activity makes neurons fire in a regular, synchronized way, which then disrupts signals to the cerebellum and leads to tremors. However, studies, especially those examining brain tissue, propose a new hypothesis that ET may be a neurodegenerative disease focused in the cerebellum, differing from the old theory. Changes in the cerebellum could also be mediated by alcoholic beverage consumption. Purkinje cells are especially susceptible to ethanol excitotoxicity. Impairment of Purkinje synapses is a component of cerebellar degradation that could underlie essential tremor. Some cases have Lewy bodies in the locus ceruleus. ET cases that progress to Parkinson's disease are less likely to have had cerebellar problems. Neuroimaging studies have suggested that the efficiency of the overall brain functional network in ET is disrupted.

In 2012, the National Toxicology Program concluded that sufficient evidence exists of an association between blood lead exposure at levels >10 μg/dl and essential tremor in adults, and limited evidence at blood lead levels >5 μg/dl.

== Diagnosis ==
Usually, the diagnosis is established on clinical grounds. Although ET was long considered a single-symptom illness, recent studies have shown that some patients also experience other additional motor symptoms and non-motor features. According to recent medical literature, besides isolated essential tremor, there are two additional classifications: 'ET plus' and 'ET-PD.' 'ET plus' is diagnosed when patients show cognitive impairments or other motor symptoms like ataxia, dystonia, or resting tremor. 'ET-PD' is used for those who meet the criteria for both ET and Parkinson's disease. The clinical features of tremor in a patient include medical history (such as age of onset, family history, progression over time, and exposure to drugs or toxins), tremor characteristics (like which parts of the body are affected, when the tremor occurs, and its frequency), and any associated signs (such as signs of systemic illness, neurological signs, and soft signs). For some types of tremors, additional tests like recording tremor frequency, imaging for lesions, receptor imaging, and biomarkers in blood or tissue may help identify the cause. Tremors can start at any age, from birth through advanced ages (senile tremor). Any voluntary muscle in the body may be affected, although the tremor is most commonly seen in the hands and arms and slightly less commonly in the neck (causing the person's head to shake), tongue, and legs. A resting tremor of the hands is sometimes present. Tremor occurring in the legs might be diagnosable as orthostatic tremor. Tremors in the lower limbs are quite rare in ET and are more likely to indicate Parkinson's disease.

ET occurs within multiple neurological disorders besides Parkinson's disease. This includes migraine disorders, where co-occurrences between ET and migraines have been examined.

== Treatment ==
=== Treatment approaches ===
Currently, most treatments and therapies available for essential tremors are only treating symptoms since there is no cure available. Medical treatments for tremors are based on shared decisions between patients and their providers. The choices of treatments depended on tremor severity, affected body parts, and the impacts of tremor on the patient's physical, psychological, and quality of life. People with mild tremors that do not interfere with daily activities and psychological well-being do not require pharmacological treatments. People with persistent tremors which impact daily functions and social interactions should be treated with the appropriate pharmacological therapies.

==== Non-pharmacological Treatment ====
The first approach in helping people to improve tremor symptoms is the discontinuation of triggering and exacerbating factors like medications including certain antidepressants, anti-epileptics, beta-agonists; or substances like caffeine. In addition, getting adequate sleep and utilizing relaxation techniques can also help improve and reduce tremor symptoms in individuals who reported an increase in tremors following physical activities.

Since tremors can affect different parts of the body (like limbs, head, chin/jaw, and vocal), different non-pharmacological therapeutic techniques are available that can support patients with the management of tremors including occupational therapy, speech therapy, and psychotherapy. Occupational therapy provides support to help people manage everyday tasks more easily through different approaches and interventions. Speech therapy is helpful in people with vocal tremor to help manage and maintain the vocal changes associated with tremor symptoms. Psychological impacts like embarrassment and anxiety are also important concerns of many people with ET which can lead to social isolation and depression. Psychotherapy can be very beneficial and play a key role in helping to improve the mental health of people with ET.

"Focused Ultrasound" is a treatment that was approved for coverage in the U.S. in 2022 for those with Medicare insurance. Totally non-surgical, the treatment process is performed on a conscious patient and takes 2 to 3 hours.

==== Alcohol ====
Alcohol had been known to help provide short-term relief of tremor symptoms in some people; however, the therapeutic effects of alcohol on ET had not been studied in many clinical trials. It has been proposed that alcohol can help reduce tremors through the agonism mechanism of the gamma-aminobutyric acid GABAergic. Since GABA can decrease neural activity, it is believed that alcohol can increase the activity of GABA which then can reduce involuntary muscle movements or tremors. However, the duration of action of alcohol on ET is around 3–4 hours, alcohol also had been associated with the rebound of tremor, not to mention the risk of development of long-term alcohol consumption and abuse. The use of alcohol as a possible treatment for ET is not recommended by healthcare providers.

=== Pharmacological treatments ===
Currently, the available pharmacological therapy options for ET are Beta-adrenergic blockers, Anticonvulsants, Benzodiazepines/GABAergic agents, Calcium channel blockers, and Atypical neuroleptic agents. The two most effective medications which had been approved by the FDA as first line agents for the treatment of ET are propranolol and primidone.

Summary of main drugs used in pharmacological treatment of essential tremor
| Drugs | Mechanism of action | Efficacy | Side-effects |
First-line therapies FDA-approved or supported by double-blinded, placebo-controlled studies (class I evidence)
| propranolol (60–800 mg/d) | non-selective β-adrenergic receptor antagonist (probable mechanism: antagonism at peripheral β_{2} receptors) | 50-70% (>50% response) | frequent (>60%): hypotension, bradycardia, fatigue, dizziness, exertional dyspnea |
| propranolol long-acting (80–320 mg/d) | non-selective β-adrenergic receptor antagonist (probable mechanism: antagonism at peripheral β_{2} receptors) | 30-38% | skin eruption, transient dizziness |
| primidone (up to 750 mg/d) | antiepileptic barbituric acid-derivative (probable mechanism: interaction with voltage-gated sodium channels or opening and potentiating GABA receptors) | 50-70% (30-50% response) | sedation, fatigue, drowsiness, dizziness, ataxia, confusion, gastrointestinal upset, loss of coordination, anorexia |
Second-line therapies Supported by double-blinded, placebo-controlled trials (class II evidence or lower)
| topiramate (up to 400 mg/d) | voltage-gated sodium channel and high voltage-activated calcium channels (antitremor mechanism unknown) | 20-37% (30-40% response) | paresthesias, trouble concentrating, gastrointestinal upset, somnolence, fatigue, confusion (discontinuation rate: 30%) |
| gabapentin (1.2-1.8 g/d), pregabalin | α_{2}δ subunit voltage-gated calcium N-type channel blockers (antitremor mechanism unknown) | 30-40% (30-50% response) | sleepiness, dizziness, ataxia, nausea, weight gain, psychiatric disturbances (including suicidal ideation) |
| alprazolam (0.125–3 mg/d), clonazepam (0.5–6 mg/d) | benzodiazepines | 30-50% (>50% response) | sedation, cognitive impairment, tolerance, dependency and abuse, withdrawal effects (discontinuation rate: 50%) |
| atenolol (50–15 mg/d) | competitive β1-adrenergic antagonist | 37% | similar to propranolol |
| metoprolol | competitive β1-adrenergic antagonist | single dose efficacy equal to propranolol (no effect after chronic use) | similar to propranolol |
| nadolol (120–240 mg/d), sotalol (75–200 mg/d), indenolol, artinolol, timolol | non-selective β-adrenergic receptor antagonists | effective only in patients responsive to propranolol | similar to propranolol with additional reduction of alertness |
| theophylline | nonselective phosphodiesterase inhibitor | long term reduction with dose 150–300 mg/d comparable to propranolol | gastrointestinal disturbances, heart problems, central nervous system excitation |
Third-line therapies Supported by open-label studies or case series
| nimodipine (120 mg/d), flunarizine, nicardipine (30 mg) | voltage-gated L-type channel blockers | 50% (>50% response) Some guidelines recommend against flunarizine, deeming it ineffective Nicardipine single-dose reduces tremor, but does not work long-term | hypotension, oedema, headache, diziness, nausea, constipation, fatigue, palpitations |
| clozapine (6–75 mg/d) | atypical antipsychotic (complex mechanism) | 50% (75% response) | sedation, orthostatic hypotension, tachycardia, syncope, weight gain, metabolic syndrome, rare side effects include agranulocytosis |
| olanzapine (mean dose 14.87 mg/d), quetiapine | atypical antipsychotics (complex mechanism) | <50% | insomnia, anxiety, headache, sedation, somnolence, diziness, weight gain, orthostatic hypotension, extrapyramidal symptoms |
| botulinum toxin (limb: 50-100 U/arm, head: 40-400 U, voice: 0.6-15 U) | inhibits presynaptic cholinergic signalling | limb (20-27%), head (67%) and voice (22-67%) tremor reduction | limb: weakness, reduced grip strength, pain, stiffness, cramping, hematoma, paresthesias; head: neck weakness, pain; voice: breathiness, weak voice, dysphagia |
| acetazolamide (62.5–750 mg/d) | carbonic anhydrase inhibitor | slight reduction, but no self-assessed improvement | electrolyte disturbances, adrenal insufficiency, kidney and liver impairment |
Fourth-line therapies Mixed evidence
| levetiracetam | inhibits presynaptic calcium channels, thus reducing neurotransmitter release | short-term reduction of limb tremor in line drawing tests | somnolence, headache, dizziness, mood disturbances (including suicidal thoughts), coordination difficulties |
| zonisamide | complex mechanism | tremor amplitude reduction, mixed evidence for reduction of total score in Fahn-Tolosa-Marin Tremor Rating Scale | multiple side effects common in patients taking zonisamide (see: article about zonisamide) |
| isoniazid (up to 1.2 g/d) | monoamine oxidase inhibitor | 18% | peripheral neuropathy, gastrointestinal disturbances, aplastic anemia, thrombocytopenia, agranulocytosis, pyridoxine deficiency, liver enzyme elevations |
| glutethimide | GABA signalling inducer | slight reduction | nausea, headache, sedation, blurred vision, ataxia, memory impairment, paradoxical excitement, skin eruptions |

==== Beta-adrenergic Blockers ====
Chemical structure of Propranolol, one of the most effective medication for treating ET

When symptoms are sufficiently troublesome to warrant treatment, the first choice medication is propranolol, a non-selective beta-blocker, which has been shown effective in reducing tremor by 70% in 50% of patients in clinical studies. Based on the guidelines from the American Academy of Neurology and the Italian Movement Disorders Association, propranolol is most effective in limb tremors, also there is little to no effect on head tremors. The recommended doses of propranolol range from 60 to 360 mg daily, and it is based on the patient's specific factors. The commonly reported side effects of propranolol are bradycardia, bronchospasm, fatigue, and hypotension. In patients that have contraindicated comorbidities to propranolol, other beta-blockers such as Atenolol, pindolol, Sotalol, and nadolol have shown some potential efficacy, but they are not very well studied and have limited evidence in their efficacy on the treatment of ET.

==== Anticonvulsants ====
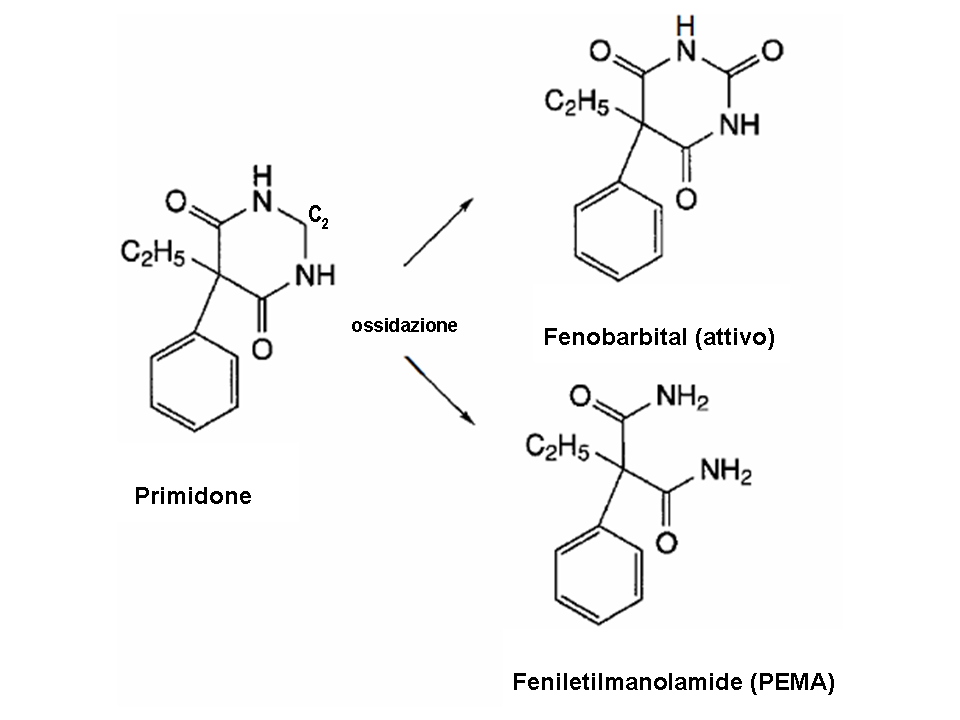
chemical structures of primidone and two metabolites, phenobarbital and phenylethylmalonamide

Primidone is another first line agent recommended in the treatment of ET. Primidone is an anticonvulsant which metabolized into phenobarbital and phenylethylmalonamide. This medication has shown the same beneficial effects in reducing tremors as propranolol and is recommended for use based on guidelines from the American Academy of Neurology and the MDS Task Force on Tremor. The initial dose of primidone is recommended at 25 mg per day and should be increased up to the maximum dose of 250 mg per day. This strategy was recommended to help avoid the possible side effects of nausea, vomiting, and excessive sedation of primidone. Primidone is the preferred medication for the treatment of ET in the geriatric population compared to propranolol. In addition, Combination therapy of both Propranolol and Primidone is recommended for people who do not show benefits from either propranolol or primidone as monotherapy.

Topiramate is an antiepileptic medication which had been studied to assess the efficacy and safety in the treatment of ET. Overall, it is considered a second-line therapy alone or in combination with other medications when first-line treatments fail to show improvement or medication intolerance. Topiramate has been shown effective in reducing limb tremors at the maximum dose of 200 mg, however, there was a higher risk for the development of adverse effects including weight loss, anorexia, cognitive impairment, and kidney stones.

==== Other second-line medications ====
Additional medications that have been reported to show efficacy in treating ET are gabapentin, benzodiazepines such as alprazolam, clonazepam, and zonisamide, and pregabalin. However, most of the medications have limited evidence-based to support their clinical usage as treatments for ET. Some systematic reviews of medications for the treatment of ET have been conducted. A 2017 review of topiramate found limited data and low-quality evidence to support its efficacy and the occurrence of treatment-limiting adverse effects, a 2017 review of zonisamide found insufficient information to assess efficacy and safety, and a 2016 review of pregabalin determined the effects to be uncertain due to the low quality of evidence.

==== Botulinum Toxin (BoNT) ====
Botulinum toxin is a neurotoxin produced by a gram-positive, rod-shaped bacteria called Clostridium botulinum. BoNT works by inhibiting acetylcholine release at the presynaptic terminal by inactivating the SNARE proteins (SNAP-25), which interfere with muscle contraction. BoNT type A injections have shown benefits in several clinical trials for the treatments of limb, voice, and head. However, the associated side effects included muscle weakness, stiffness reported within studies of limb tremors, and neck muscle pain, weakness, and dysphagia in clinical trials of head tremors. Botulinum toxin type A has been found to be helpful in treating voice tremors.

=== Additional procedures ===
==== Ultrasound ====
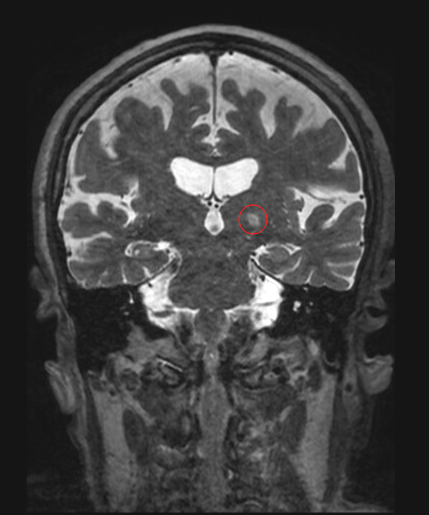
Frontal MRI four days after MRgFUS (MRI-guided high-intensity focused ultrasound): Left ventral intermediate nucleus (Vim) thalamotomy. 79-year-old man with essential tremor.

Additionally, MRI-guided high-intensity focused ultrasound is a nonsurgical treatment option for people with essential tremor who are medication refractory. MRI-guided high-intensity focused ultrasound does not achieve healing, but can improve the quality of life by reducing the tremor manifestation. While its long-term effects are not yet established, the improvement in tremor score from baseline was durable at 1 year and 2 years following the treatment. To date, reported adverse events and side effects have been mild to moderate. Possible adverse events include gait difficulties, balance disturbances, paresthesias, headache, skin burns with ulcerations, skin retraction, scars, and blood clots. This procedure is contraindicated in pregnant women, persons who have non-MRI compatible implanted metallic devices, allergy to MR contrast agents, cerebrovascular disease, abnormal bleeding, hemorrhage and/or blood clotting disorders, advanced kidney disease or on dialysis, heart conditions, severe hypertension, and ethanol or substance abuse, among others. The US Food and Drug Administration (FDA) approved Insightec's Exablate Neuro system to treat essential tremor in 2016.

==== Deep Brain Stimulation (DBS) ====
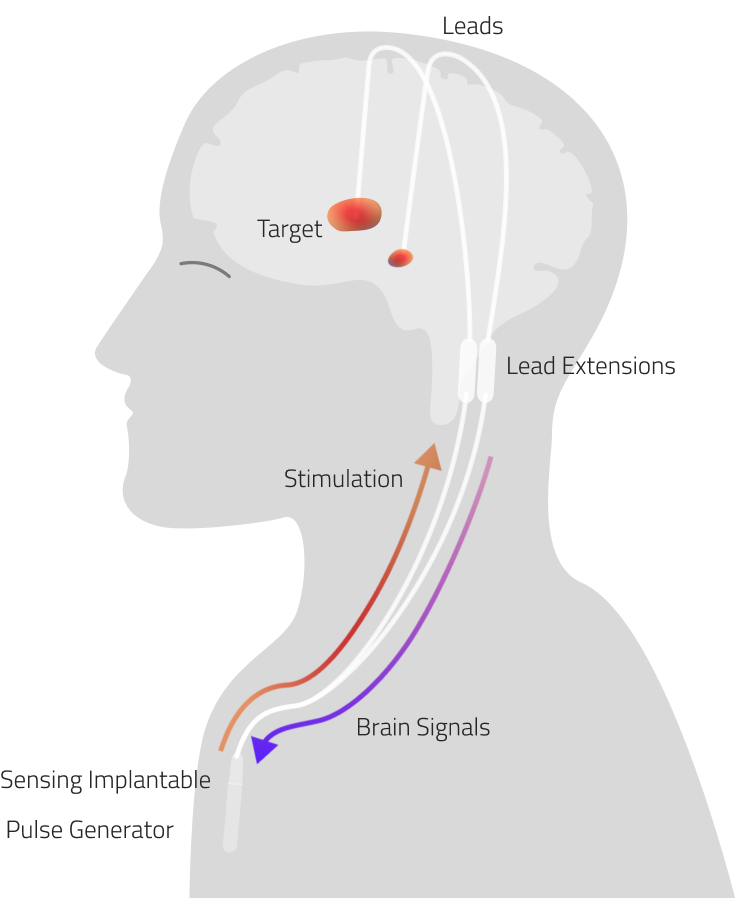
Illustration of the placement of electrodes and stimulator of Deep Brain Stimulation surgical treatment.

Another invasive surgical treatment of essential tremor is deep brain stimulation (DBS). DBS is a surgical procedure that involves the placement of a permanent electrode with 4-8 contacts within the brain with connecting wires connected to a pulse stimulator implanted near the patient's collarbone. In the treatment of tremor, the electrodes are placed in the ventral intermediate nucleus (Vim) of the thalamus.

The pulse stimulator delivers constant electrical pulses to the target area, which interfere with activity of the target area, which has been shown to improve tremor symptoms. At one year following the surgical intervention with DBS, patients showed 66% improvement and 48% improvement at 10 years. DBS is considered an effective surgical treatment of ET, but there are associated side effects and complications that have been reported with DBS in clinical trials, including imbalance or gait instability, dystonia, paresthesia, hemorrhage.

==== Electrical Stimulation of Peripheral Limbs ====
Another nonsurgical treatment option that has been suggested as a less invasive alternative to DBS is electrically stimulating the peripheral limbs most affected by ET. This stimulation has been explored using different stimulation intensities, either above the motoneuron activation threshold (thus directly activating the muscles in peripheral limbs), or below the motoneuron activation threshold but above the sensory afferent neuron threshold. While electrical stimulation above the activation motoneuron threshold can reduce tremor by up to 73%, it causes muscle fatigue and discomfort. Stimulating below the motoneuron activation threshold on the other hand requires precise timing to counteract the descending pathological neuronal signals driving ET in the peripheral limbs. Thus, while this treatment option shows promise it still requires rigorous investigation.

== Prognosis ==
Although essential tremor is often mild, people with severe tremor have difficulty performing many of their routine activities of daily living. ET is generally progressive in most cases (sometimes rapidly, sometimes very slowly), and can be disabling in severe cases.

== Epidemiology ==
Essential tremor (ET) is a common neurological disorder, affecting up to 5% of the global population, with approximately 24.91 million people affected worldwide in 2020. The prevalence of ET increases significantly with age, particularly in individuals aged 60 and above. It affects around 0.4% of people aged 40 and older, and the prevalence rises to 2.87% in those over 80, reaching up to 20% in individuals in their 90s and beyond. ET is more common in males than females across all age groups.

Family history plays a significant role in the development of ET, with around 50% of cases being hereditary and a 90% concordance rate in identical twins. While the likelihood of developing ET increases with age, it can also occur in younger individuals, especially if there is a family history of the disorder. ET is one of the most common types of tremor, aside from enhanced physiological tremor, and is among the most frequently observed movement disorders. Although not all studies show this trend; the majority of studies (70%) indicate that there are no sex differences in prevalence.

== Society and culture ==
Actress Katharine Hepburn (1907–2003) had an essential tremor, possibly inherited from her grandfather, that caused her head—and sometimes her hands—to shake. The tremor was noticeable by the time of her performance in the 1979 film The Corn Is Green, when critics mentioned the "palsy that kept her head trembling". Hepburn's tremor worsened in her later life.

Charles M. Schulz, American cartoonist and creator of the Peanuts comic strip, was affected during the last two decades of his life.

West Virginia Senator Robert Byrd also had essential tremor.

In 2010, musician Daryl Dragon of The Captain and Tennille was diagnosed with essential tremor; the condition became so severe that he was no longer able to play the keyboards.

Director-writer-producer-comedian Adam McKay was diagnosed with essential tremor.

Downton Abbey creator Julian Fellowes has the condition, as does the show's character Charlie Carson, played by Jim Carter.

In 2022, Matthew Caws of Nada Surf and his son made a PSA called "Living with a Mild Essential Tremor".

== Research ==
Harmaline is a widely used model of essential tremor (ET) in rodents. Harmaline is thought to act primarily on neurons in the inferior olive. Olivocerebellar neurons exhibit rhythmic excitatory action when harmaline is applied locally. Harmane or harmaline has been implicated not only in essential tremors, but is also found in greater quantities in the brain fluid of people with Parkinson's disease and cancer. Higher levels of the neurotoxin are associated with greater severity of the tremors. Harmane is particularly abundant in meats, and certain cooking practices (e.g., long cooking times) increase its concentration, but at least one study has shown that harmane blood concentrations do not go up after meat consumption in ET patients with already elevated harmane levels, whereas the control group's harmane levels increase accordingly, suggesting that another factor, such as a metabolic defect, may be responsible for the higher harmane levels in ET patients.

Caprylic acid is being researched as a possible treatment for essential tremor. It has currently been approved by the FDA and designated as GRAS, and is used as a food additive and has been studied as part of a ketogenic diet for treatment of epilepsy in children. Research on caprylic acid as a possible treatment for ET began because researchers recognized that ethanol was effective in reducing tremor, and because of this, they looked into longer-chain alcohols reducing tremor. They discovered that 1-octanol reduced tremor and did not have the negative side effects of ethanol. Pharmacokinetic research on 1-octanol lead to the discovery that 1-octanol metabolized into caprylic acid in the body and that caprylic acid actually was the tremor-reducing agent. Many studies of the effects of caprylic acid on essential tremor have been done, including a dose-escalation study on ET patients and a study testing the effects of caprylic acid on central and peripheral tremor. The dose-escalation study examined doses of 8 mg/kg to 128 mg/kg and determined that these concentrations were safe with mild side effects. The maximum tolerated dose was not reached in this study. The study testing the effects of caprylic acid on central and peripheral tremors determined that caprylic acid reduced both.

Ulixacaltamide (formerly PRAX-944) is an investigational T-type calcium channel blocker. It is designed to reduce tremor by inhibiting abnormal burst firing in the cerebello-thalamo-cortical circuit. In late 2025, the drug completed Phase 3 clinical trials with positive results and received Breakthrough Therapy designation from the U.S. FDA. In February 2026, Praxis Precision Medicines submitted a New Drug Application (NDA) to the FDA. The FDA accepted the application for review in April 2026 and set a target action date of January 2027. Detailed Phase 3 results were subsequently presented at the April 2026 American Academy of Neurology (AAN) Annual Meeting, demonstrating that the drug significantly improved patients' activities of daily living compared to placebo.

A major factor attributed to the clinical success of the ulixacaltamide Phase 3 program was a paradigm shift in efficacy assessment methodology. Historically, essential tremor drug trials relied heavily on clinic-based performance snapshots, most notably the evaluation of Archimedes spiral drawings. However, recent methodological critiques presented at the 2026 AAN Annual Meeting highlighted that relying on brief, 90-second clinical tasks creates a "sampling theorem" problem. Because tremor amplitude fluctuates continuously throughout the day, a single momentary snapshot cannot accurately capture a patient's true functional disability.

Furthermore, traditional visual scoring of these spirals introduces significant inter-rater variability, and even state-of-the-art automated digital analyses of spirals have demonstrated minimal correlation with real-world clinical improvements. Researchers have concluded that the decades-long reliance on these artificial performance measures inadvertently thwarted pharmacological advancement in the field. As a result, modern trial designs are shifting toward Modified Activities of Daily Living (mADL) scales. Unlike spirals, mADL scales provide a multi-day retrospective evaluation of the specific functional domains that patients consistently identify as the most severely impacted, such as writing, eating, and drinking.

== Terminology ==
This type of tremor is often referred to as "kinetic tremor". Essential tremor has been known as "benign essential tremor", but the adjective "benign" has been removed in recognition of the sometimes disabling nature of the disorder.

== See also ==
- Intention tremor
