= Rubro-olivary tract =

Part of the nervous system

Details

Identifiers
- Latin: Fibrae rubroolivares
- NeuroNames: 1419
- TA98: A14.1.04.135; A14.1.06.214
- TA2: 5870
- FMA: 77050

The rubro-olivary tract (rubroolivary fibers) is a tract which connects the inferior olivary nucleus, and the parvocellular red nucleus.

It is hypothesized that it uses both the corticospinal and rubrospinal tracts.
