= Central pain syndrome =

- Specialty: Neurology, pain medicine, pain psychology

Central pain syndrome, also known as central neuropathic pain, is a neurological condition consisting of constant moderate to severe neuropathic pain following damage to the central nervous system (CNS), causing sensitization of the pain systems. The extent of pain and the areas affected are related to the cause of the injury and the damage done.

== Signs and symptoms ==
Pain can either be relegated to a specific part of the body or spread to the entire body. It is typically constant, and may be moderate to severe in intensity. Those who are afflicted describe it as being stuck in a loop of pain. It is often made worse by touch, movement, emotions, barometric pressure and temperature changes, usually cold temperatures along with many other similar 'triggers'. Cold temperatures regularly make the burning pain worse in certain body parts. Burning pain is the most common sensation, but patients also report pins and needles, pressing, lacerating, aching, and extreme bursts or constant sharp or unremitting excruciating pain. Individuals may have reduced sensitivity to touch in the areas affected by the pain, as if the part is 'falling asleep'. The burning and loss of sense of touch are usually, but not always, most severe on the distant parts of the body, such as the feet or hands, spreading until it is in some cases felt from head to toe. Usually the burning pain in body parts is a result of old injuries that seem like they should have healed long ago, yet the pain lingers on and even years afterwards. For some patients with intense affliction, there often can be unremitting nausea, causing vomiting. The pain can also bring on hyperventilation. Blood pressure can rise due to the pain.

== Cause ==
Damage to the CNS can be caused by physical trauma, traffic collisions, spinal cord injury, tumors, stroke, or diseases such as multiple sclerosis, Parkinson's disease, Graves' disease, Addison's disease, and epilepsy. It may develop months or years after injury or damage to the CNS.

== Diagnosis ==
A diagnosis of central pain syndrome is based upon identification of characteristic symptoms, a detailed patient history, a thorough clinical evaluation and a variety of specialized tests. Central pain syndrome is suspected in individuals who complain of pain or other abnormal sensations following injury to the central nervous system. Other conditions that cause pain may need to be excluded before a diagnosis of central pain syndrome is made.

== Treatment ==
Pain medications often provide some reduction of pain, but not complete relief of pain, for those affected by central pain syndrome. Tricyclic antidepressants such as nortriptyline or anticonvulsants such as neurontin (gabapentin) can be useful, but also provide incomplete relief. Lowering stress levels appears to reduce pain.

== Prognosis ==
Central pain syndrome is not a fatal disorder, but the syndrome causes disabling chronic pain and suffering among the majority of individuals who have it.

== See also ==
- Thalamic syndrome
