= Magnocellular red nucleus =

Nucleus of the rostral midbrain involved in motor coordination

Identifiers
- NeuroLex ID: birnlex_720

The magnocellular red nucleus (mRN or mNR or RNm) is located in the rostral midbrain and is involved in motor coordination. Together with the parvocellular red nucleus, the mRN makes up the red nucleus. Due to the role it plays in motor coordination, the magnocellular red nucleus may be implicated in the characteristic symptom of restless legs syndrome (RLS). The mRN receives most of its signals from the motor cortex and the cerebellum.

== Overview ==
Section, in the transverse plane through the human midbrain at the level of the superior colliculus, that shows the rough path of each nervus oculomotorius from its nucleus toward the eye and the relative location of the red nucleus. For reference, the bottom of the picture is where the front of the head is located.

The red nucleus (RN), a group of neurons composed of the parvocellular red nucleus (pRN) and the magnocellular red nucleus (mRN), contributes to movement and motor control within the forelimb. Primate studies have shown that more forelimb mRN neuron discharges are observed when the location of the target object a primate is reaching is on the right or above. This demonstrates that although forelimb mRN neurons are involved in grasping movements to the left, right, above, and below, they play a greater role when an organism is attempting to reach an object to the right or above. Scientists were also able to find differences in the functions and anatomies between the parvicellular and magnocellular regions of red nuclei in monkeys. Single unit recording in two monkeys that were kept awake during experimentation was used to search for functional differences between the two regions of the red nucleus. In order to investigate inputs to the two regions, anatomical tracing of WGA-HRP was used. Overall, the magnocellular region was much more responsive than that parvicellular region. The pRN is located in the diencephalon, a division of the forebrain, and the mRN is located in the mesencephalon (midbrain). Unlike the pRN, which is both GABAergic and glutamatergic, the mRN is solely glutamatergic.

The RN is capable of projection onto the spinal cord interneurons and motor neurons of signals integrated from the motor cortex and cerebellum. The mRN already existed in tetrapods after they became terrestrial. It became further developed in mammals when the volume of the mRN increased along with the development of the intermediate cerebellum and the interposed nuclei.

== Neuron Counts in pRN and mRN ==
The absolute number of pRN and mRN neurons in the midbrain can be estimated. An analysis of complete sets of serial 40-μm glycolmethacrylate sections can be used to find this number. This was done on six young adult male rats, and a complete set of these serials sections for each rat were used to quantify the neuronal numbers. By using Cavalieri's method, the total volume of the red nucleus can be estimated. The optical dissector method on the same set of sampled sections is then used to estimate the numerical density Nv, or the number of neurons within a certain volume ("subvolume") of the nucleus. The absolute number of neurons can then be found by multiplying the total volume of the nucleus by the numerical density. In rat brains, there is an average of 8394 pRN and 6986 mRN.

The number of pRN and mRN can be used to gain a better understanding of how organisms differ in motor abilities. It has been reported that mice have a total of around 3200 neurons in the red nucleus, while rats have an average of nearly 15,400 neurons. Compared to rats, mice have inferior motor abilities in skilled reaching tasks, which has been reported to potentially be a result of the varying neuron counts in the red nucleus.

== Development ==
=== Phylogenetically ===
The RN, consisting of the pRN and the mRN, can be found in land vertebrates and some species of rays. It is defined by its relative position and relation to its contralateral rubrospinal projections, tegmentum mesencephalic and crossed rubrospinal tract. Although a crossed rubrospinal tract is absent in boidae, sharks, and limbless amphibians, it is present in certain rays. The rays which have this use their pectoral fins to move. A version of the rubrospinal tract is found in lungfishes but not in advanced snakes, suggesting that the rubrospinal tract is directly related to the presence of limbs. The connectivity of the RN is determined by the type and complexity of motor function that land vertebrates are capable of.

=== Ontogenetically ===
Separated immature RNm cells first appear around 12 weeks of gestation. They show up in clumps dorsal to the parvocellular red nucleus (RNp). The RNm then takes the shape of a crescent moon ventral to the RNp consisting of basophilic neurons. 18 to 23 weeks into gestation, the neurons then appear dorsal to the RNp, as island clusters among the myelinated oculomotor nerve roots. Around 28 weeks, the nerves are distributed ventrolateral to the superior cerebellar peduncle as well as around the caudal pole of the RNp. As gestation progresses, the neurons increase in volume, fracturing into two distinct sizes, which become clear at 33 weeks. In summary, the differentiation and maturation of the RNm slowly progresses in the later half of gestation, and the locations of the magnocellular red nuclei vary across the brain. A 2012 study shows that the human fetus has a more developed mRN than an adult, because of its greater number of "myelinated fibers in the rubrospinal tracts." This suggests that the mRN plays a greater role earlier on in development than later on in life.
