= Rubrospinal tract =

Part of the nervous system

- Rubrospinal tract is labeled in red on the left of the diagram.

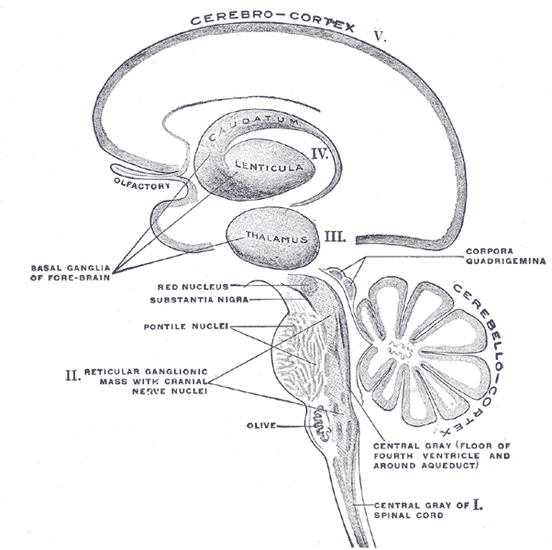
- Schematic representation of the chief ganglionic categories (Rubrospinal tract not labeled, but red nucleus visible near center)

Details

Identifiers
- Latin: tractus rubrospinalis
- NeuroLex ID: birnlex_1476
- TA98: A14.1.02.220; A14.1.04.136; A14.1.05.332; A14.1.06.213
- TA2: 6097
- FMA: 73995

The rubrospinal tract is one of the descending tracts of the spinal cord. It is a motor control pathway that originates in the red nucleus. It is a part of the lateral indirect extrapyramidal tract.

The rubrospinal tract fibers are efferent nerve fibers from the magnocellular part of the red nucleus. (Rubro-olivary fibers are efferents from the parvocelluar part of the red nucleus).

It is functionally less important in humans. It is involved in motor control of distal flexors of the upper limb—especially of the hand and fingers—by promoting flexor tone while inhibiting extensors.

== Structure ==
The rubrospinal tract originates in the magnocellular red nucleus in the midbrain, and decussates (crosses over) at the midline in the anterior tegmental decussation. In the pons, it is situated medially within the rostral pontine tegmentum. In the medulla oblongata, it descends within the lateral tegmentum medial to the spinocerebellar tract, and posterior to the spinothalamic tract. It descends with the corticospinal tract (and other fibers) in the lateral funiculus of the spinal cord, and goes to the contralateral cervical spinal cord. Each rubrospinal fiber terminates in a specific area of the spinal cord.

== Function ==
In humans, the rubrospinal tract is one of several motor control pathways. It is smaller and has fewer axons than the corticospinal tract, suggesting that it is less important in motor control. It is one of the pathways for the mediation of involuntary movement, along with other extra-pyramidal tracts including the vestibulospinal, tectospinal, and reticulospinal tracts. The rubrospinal fibers generally excite flexor motor neurons and inhibit the extensor motor neurons. It terminates primarily in the cervical and thoracic portions of the spinal cord, suggesting that it functions in upper limb but not in lower limb control.

It is small and rudimentary in humans. In some other primates, however, experiments have shown that over time, the rubrospinal tract can assume almost all the duties of the corticospinal tract when the corticospinal tract is lesioned.

== See also ==
- Upper motor neuron
