= Physiologic tremor =

- Differential diagnosis: Hyperthyroidism

Physiologic tremor is a tremor or trembling of a limb or other body part. The recorded frequency is in the range of 8-12Hz. It occurs in normal individuals, especially when they are stressed by anxiety or fatigue. It is therefore common in sports such as rock-climbing where it is known by names such as Elvis leg or sewing machine leg. It may occur in an enhanced form as a pathological symptom of conditions such as hyperthyroidism or stimulants such as caffeine.
