= Lhermitte's sign =

Uncomfortable "electric" sensation going down the back and limbs

- Other names: Lhermitte phenomenon
- Pronunciation: /lɛərˈmiːt/
- Differential diagnosis: Compression of the upper spinal cord, multiple sclerosis, transverse myelitis, Behçet's disease, osteogenesis imperfecta

In neurology, Lhermitte phenomenon, also called the barber chair phenomenon, is an uncomfortable "electrical" sensation that runs down the back and into the limbs. The sensation can feel like it goes up or down the spine. It is painful for some, although others might simply feel strange sensations.

In many people, it is elicited by bending the head forward. It can also be evoked when a practitioner pounds on the cervical spine while the neck is flexed; this is caused by involvement of the posterior columns. Lhermitte phenomenon is named after the French neurologist Jean Lhermitte.

== Associated conditions ==
The sign suggests a lesion or compression of the upper cervical spinal cord or lower brainstem—usually dorsal columns of the cervical cord or caudal medulla.

Although often considered a classic finding in multiple sclerosis, it can be caused by a number of conditions, including transverse myelitis, Behçet disease, osteogenesis imperfecta, trauma, radiation myelopathy, vitamin B12 deficiency (subacute combined degeneration), compression of the spinal cord in the neck from any cause such as cervical spondylosis, disc herniation, tumor, and Arnold–Chiari malformation. Lhermitte's sign may also appear during or following high-dose chemotherapy. Irradiation of the cervical spine may also evoke it as an early delayed radiation injury, which occurs within 4 months of radiation therapy.

Delayed onset Lhermitte's sign has been reported following head and/or neck trauma. This occurs ~2 1/2 months following injury, without associated neurological symptoms or pain, and typically resolves within 1 year.

This sign is also sometimes seen as part of a "discontinuation syndrome" associated with certain psychotropic medications, such as selective serotonin reuptake inhibitors and serotonin norepinephrine reuptake inhibitors, particularly paroxetine and venlafaxine. Typically, it only occurs after having taken the medication for some duration, and then stopped or withdrawn rapidly or after administering reduced dose. Fluoxetine, given its very long half-life, can be given as a single small dose, and often avoid Lhermitte's sign and other withdrawal symptoms.

In the dental field, three studies (Layzer 1978, Gutmann 1979, Blanco 1983) have identified Lhermitte sign among nitrous oxide abusers. This is likely due to nitrous oxide depletion of vitamin B_{12} leading to a very severe, rapid deficiency in the absence of supplementation.

== Terminology ==
Lhermitte sign is not attributed to its discoverer. It was first described by Pierre Marie and Chatelin in 1917. Jean Lhermitte, a French neurologist and neuropsychiatrist, did not publish his first report until 1920. However, in 1924 he did publish the seminal article on the subject which resulted in it becoming well known.
