= Roussy–Lévy syndrome =

- Specialty: Neurology

Roussy–Lévy syndrome, also known as Roussy–Lévy areflexic dystasia, is a rare medical disorder that results in progressive muscle wasting. It is caused by a mutation in the genes encoding proteins necessary for the functioning of the myelin sheath, which impacts the conductance of nerve signals and results in loss of the muscles' ability to move. The condition affects people from infancy through adulthood.

== Signs and symptoms ==
Symptoms of the Roussy–Lévy syndrome arise from nerve damage and a resulting progressive muscle atrophy. Neurological damage may result in absent tendon reflexes (areflexia), some distal sensory loss and decreased excitability of muscles to electrical stimulation, both galvanic (longer) and faradic (shorter pulses). Progressive muscle wasting results in weakness of distal limb muscles (especially the peronei), gait ataxia, pes cavus, postural tremors, static tremor of the upper limbs and foot deformity.

These symptoms frequently translate into delayed onset of ability to walk, loss of coordination and balance, foot drop, and foot-bone deformities. They are usually first observed during infancy or early childhood, and slowly progress until about age 30, at which point progression may stop in some individuals.

== Causes ==
Roussy–Lévy is an autosomal dominant transmitted disease. This syndrome has been associated with two mutations: a duplication of the PMP22 gene that carries the instructions for producing the peripheral myelin protein 22, a critical component of the myelin sheath; and a missense mutation in the MPZ gene which codes for myelin protein zero, a major structural protein of peripheral myelin.

As PMP22 mutations are also associated with Charcot–Marie–Tooth disease type 1A, and MPZ mutations are associated with Charcot–Marie–Tooth disease type 1B, it remains the subject of discussion whether the Roussy–Lévy syndrome is a separate entity or a specific phenotype of either disorder.

== Pathophysiology ==
In common with Charcot–Marie–Tooth disease, examination reveals decreased nerve conduction velocity and histologic features of a hypertrophic demyelinating neuropathy. Electromyography shows signs of mild neurogenic damage while biopsy shows onion bulb formations. The appearance of these formations is what primarily led Gustave Roussy and Gabrielle Lévy, the scientists who first described the disorder, to classify it as a variant of Charcot–Marie–Tooth disease.

To create a working nerve, neurons, Schwann cells, and fibroblasts must work together. Molecular signals are exchanged between Schwann cells and neurons to regulate survival and differentiation of a nerve. However, these signals are disrupted in patients with the Roussy–Lévy syndrome due to misfolding Schwann cells, causing demyelination.

== Diagnosis ==
When a clinical picture points towards the diagnosis of the Roussy–Lévy syndrome, the condition can only be confirmed with absolute certainty by carrying out genetic testing and MRI.

== Treatment ==
Roussy–Lévy syndrome has no pharmacological treatment. Treatment options focus on corrective therapy. Patients tend to benefit greatly from physical therapy (especially water therapy as it does not place excessive pressure on the muscles), while moderate activity is often recommended to maintain movement, flexibility, muscle strength and endurance. While no medicines are reported to treat the disorder, patients have been given propranolol on a trial basis with mild improvement.

Patients with foot deformities may benefit from corrective surgery, which is usually a last resort. Most such surgeries include straightening and pinning the toes, lowering the arch, and sometimes fusing the ankle joint to provide stability. Recovery from this type of surgery is often long and difficult. Proper foot care including custom-made shoes and leg braces may minimize discomfort and increase function.

== Prognosis ==
Roussy–Lévy syndrome is not a fatal disease and life expectancy is normal.

== See also ==
- Charcot–Marie–Tooth disease
- Dejerine–Sottas disease
