= Paul Oulmont =

French neurologist (1849–1917)

- Born: 21 April 1849; Épinal, France
- Died: 3 November 1917 (aged 68); Paris, France
- Known for: Research on athetosis and neurological disorders
- Scientific career
- Fields: Neurology, medicine
- Workplaces: Salpêtrière Hospital
- Thesis: (1878)
- Academic advisors: Jean-Martin Charcot

Paul Oulmont (April 21, 1849 – November 3, 1917) was a French neurologist and a noted art collector.

Oulmont was born April 21, 1849, in Épinal, France, the son of Charles Oulmont (1819–1875) and Mathilde Lehmann (1827–c.1875). In 1878 he married Louise Julie Emerique. He bestowed an important collection of drawings to his native town of Épinal. Oulmont received his medical degree in 1873 and was appointed Jean-Martin Charcot's house officer in 1877. In 1878, he defended his thesis on athetosis, closely followed by papers which included the first description of double athetosis. Although athetosis was known as "Hammond's disease," after William Alexander Hamilton ( 1828-1900), Oulmont presented a much earlier description written in 1853 by his mentor, Charcot, who classified the disorder as a form of chorea. Oulmont's name is associated with a number of disorders including diabetic neuropathy, Mercury toxicity in tics, and facial hemiplegia.

He died November 3, 1917, in Paris.

== Works by Oulmont ==
- Étude clinique sur l'athétose, Paris, 1878
- Athetosis. In: Monthly Abstract of Medical Science 1878; vol. 5, p. 391–392.
- De l’athétose. In: Revue Mensuelle de Medicine et de Chirurgie. 1878; vol. 2, p. 81–94.
- Thérapeutique des névroses, Paris, O. Doin, 1894, reissued in 1910
- L'Obésité, symptomatologique et étiologique, anatomie et physiologie pathologique, Paris, O. Doin, 1907, (in collaboration with Félix Ramond)

== Honours ==
A room at the Bichat Hospital was named in his honor in 1931.
