= Palatal myoclonus =

Spasms of the palatal (roof of the mouth) muscles

- Palatal myoclonus

Palatal myoclonus is a rare condition in which there are rhythmic jerky movements or a rapid spasm of the palatal (roof of the mouth) muscles. Chronic clonus is often due to lesions of the central tegmental tract (which connects the red nucleus to the ipsilateral inferior olivary nucleus).

When associated with eye movements, it is known as oculopalatal myoclonus.

== Signs and symptoms ==
Signs and symptoms of palatal myoclonus include:

- A rhythmic clicking sound in the ear due to the opening and closing of the Eustachian tube.
- Rhythmic, jerky movements in the face, eyeballs, tongue, jaw, vocal cords or extremities (mostly hands).

== Treatment ==
=== Drugs ===
Drugs used to treat palatal myoclonus include clonazepam, carbamazepine, baclofen, anticholinergics, tetrabenazine, valproic acid, phenytoin, lamotrigine, sumatriptan, and PIR. A rare case of palatal myoclonus associated with orofacial buccal dystonia has been treated with Botulinum toxin A (Dysport) injection and counseling.

== Notes ==
- http://www.tchain.com/otoneurology/disorders/central/opm.html
- https://www.hindawi.com/journals/criot/2013/231505/
- "NINDS Tremor Information Page". National Institute of Neurological Disorders and Stroke. July 20, 2007. Archived from the original on October 6, 2007.
