= Jean Lhermitte =

French neurologist and neuropsychiatrist (1877–1959)

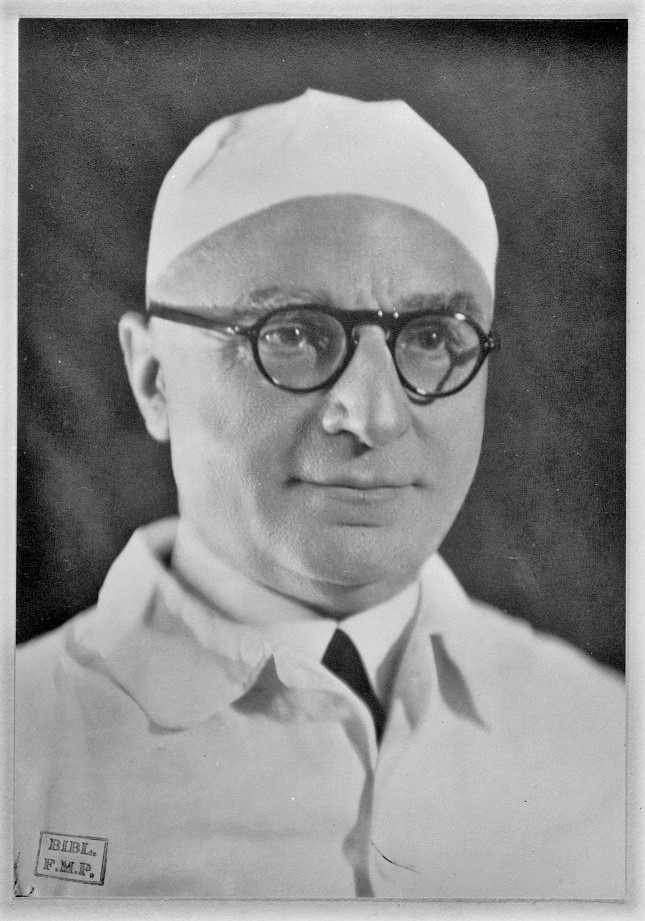
Jean Lhermitte

Jacques Jean Lhermitte (English: /lɛərˈmiːt/) (20 January 1877 – 24 January 1959) was a French neurologist and neuropsychiatrist.

== Early life and education ==
Lhermitte was born in Mont-Saint-Père, Aisne, son of Léon Augustin Lhermitte, a French realist painter. Following his early education at Saint-Etienne, he studied in Paris and graduated in medicine in 1907. He specialised in neurology and became Chef-de-clinique (resident) for nervous diseases in 1908, Chef de laboratoire in 1910, and professeur agrégé for psychiatry 1922.

== Career ==
Lhermitte became head of the Dejerine Foundation, sponsored by Joseph Jules Dejerine, and clinical director at the Pitié-Salpêtrière Hospital.

During World War I, Lhermitte studied spinal injuries and became interested in neuropsychiatry. This led to publications on visual hallucinations of the self. A deeply religious man, he explored the common territory between theology and medicine, and this led him to interesting studies on demonic possession and stigmatisation.

== Medical eponyms ==
Lhermitte was a clinical neurologist. A number of medical eponyms bear his name:

- Lhermitte-Cornil-Quesnel syndrome: A slowly progressive pyramidopallidal degeneration
- Lhermitte-Duclos syndrome: A rare pathologic entity with hypertrophy chiefly of the stratum granulosum of the cerebellum
- Lhermitte-Lévy syndrome: A syndrome of slowly progressing paralysis after a stroke
- Lhermitte-McAlpine syndrome: A combined pyramidal and extrapyramidal tract syndrome in middle-aged and elderly persons.
- Lhermitte peduncular hallucinosis: Purely visual hallucinations recognized as unreal, abnormal phenomena (preserved insight).
- Lhermitte sign: Flexion of the neck in patients with multiple sclerosis produces electric shock-like sensations that extend down the spine and may shoot into the limbs
- Lhermitte syndrome: A rare syndrome of ocular palsy with nystagmus and paralysis of adduction during attempted lateral deviation of the eyes
- Lhermitte-Trelles syndrome' A syndrome characterized by lymphoblastic infiltration of the peripheral nervous system, associated with paralysis and amyotrophy

== Bibliography ==
- Techniques anatomo-pathologiques du système nerveux. Paris, 1914.
- Psycho-névroses de guerre. Paris, 1916.
- Les blessures de la moelle épinière. Paris, 1917.
- La section totale de la moelle épinière. Paris, 1918.
- — (4 March 1920). "Les Formes douloureuses de la Commotion de la Moelle épiniére" [Painful Forms of Spinal Cord Concussion]. Revue neurologique (in French). 36 (3). Société Française de Neurologie: 257–262 – via Internet Archive.
- Les fondements biologiques de la psychologie. Paris, 1925.
- Les hallucinations: clinique et physiopathologie. Paris, 1951.
- True and false possession. Translated by the Hon. Patrick John Hepburne-Scott. New York: Hawthorn Books, 1963; OCLC Number 331062. London: Burns & Oates, 1963. Original edition: Vrais et faux possédés. Paris: Fayard, 1956; OCLC Number 13449338.
