= Parvocellular red nucleus =

Identifiers
- NeuroLex ID: birnlex_725

The parvocellular red nucleus (RNp) is located in the rostral midbrain and is involved in motor coordination. Together with the magnocellular red nucleus, it makes up the red nucleus.
