= Midbrain tegmentum =

Part of the midbrain

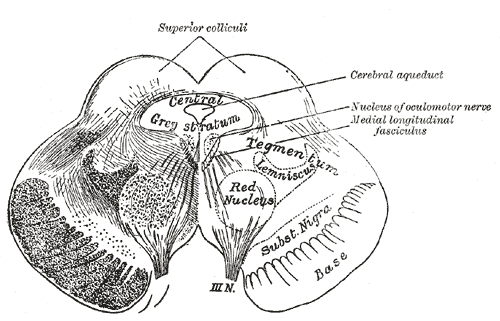
- Transverse section of mid-brain at level of superior colliculi. ("Tegmentum" visible center right.)

- Section through superior colliculus showing path of oculomotor nerve. (Tegmentum not labeled, but surrounding structures more clearly defined.)

Details
- Part of: Midbrain

Identifiers
- Latin: Tegmentum Mesencephali
- MeSH: D013681
- NeuroNames: 491
- NeuroLex ID: birnlex_1200

The midbrain is anatomically delineated into the tectum (roof) and the tegmentum (floor). The midbrain tegmentum extends from the substantia nigra to the cerebral aqueduct in a horizontal section of the midbrain. It forms the floor of the midbrain that surrounds below the cerebral aqueduct as well as the floor of the fourth ventricle while the midbrain tectum forms the roof of the fourth ventricle. The tegmentum contains a collection of tracts and nuclei with movement-related, species-specific, and pain-perception functions. The general structures of midbrain tegmentum include red nucleus and the periaqueductal grey matter.

Nigrostriatal Pathway and Mesolimbic Pathway in the Dopaminergic System

Unlike the midbrain tectum (which is a sensory structure located posteriorly), the midbrain tegmentum, which locates anteriorly, is related to a number of motor functions. Within the tegmentum, the red nucleus is in charge of motor coordination (specifically for limb movements) and the periaqueductal gray matter (PAG) contains critical circuits for modulating behavioral responses to pains. The substantia nigra (black substance) serves an important role in rewarding behaviors such as approaching desired objects. In addition, the substantia nigra forms reciprocal connections with the basal ganglia which are highly correlated with motor functions and learning.

The midbrain tegmentum is also an important part of the dopaminergic system which is essential for feelings of reward and pleasure. Two regions in the midbrain tegmentum are of particular interest. The first one is the substantia nigra which is an important part of the nigrostriatal pathway. This pathway serves to coordinate motor movements and when left unbalanced, motor deficits would follow. For instance, when the dopamine neurons are lost from the substantia nigra, the condition of extreme muscle rigidity occurs as in the Parkinson's disease. The second region is the ventral tegmental area (VTA; or simply ventral tegmentum) which is at the hub of the mesolimbic pathway. Specifically, the VTA is the origin of dopaminergic cell bodies from which signals reach the anterior parts of the brain (e.g., frontal lobes) as well as the posterior parts (e.g., cerebellum). Because of this pathway regulates the experience of reward and pleasure, it is not surprising to see that food and drugs affect it the most in terms of a loss of impulse control. That is, the mesolimbic pathway is essential in regulating drug addiction. The potential mechanism is through the associative learning of the environmental cues and reward. For instance, through each drug use, individuals increasingly associate the cues related to each drug use (e.g., the room in which the drug is taken or the people with which individuals take drug). Over time, the drug enhances the dopamine-related, classically conditioned cues associated with drug taking. As a result, later encounters with these cues will produce and heighten dopamine activity and subsequently prompt individuals to crave drugs. Moreover, excessive mesolimbic dopamine activity plays a role in schizophrenia, a behavioral disorder characterized by delusions, hallucinations, blunted emotion, agitation, etc. On the other hand, a lack of mesolimbic dopamine activity may induce deficits in attention.

== See also ==
- Pontine tegmentum
