= Red nucleus =

Structure in the human brain

- Transverse section through the midbrain showing the location of the red nuclei. The superior colliculi are at the top of image and the cerebral peduncles at the bottom of image – both in section.

Details
- Part of: Midbrain

Identifiers
- Latin: nucleus ruber
- MeSH: D012012
- NeuroNames: 505
- NeuroLex ID: birnlex_1478
- TA98: A14.1.06.323
- TA2: 5898
- FMA: 62407

The red nucleus or nucleus ruber is a structure in the rostral midbrain involved in motor coordination. The red nucleus is pale pink, which is believed to be due to the presence of iron in at least two different forms: hemoglobin and ferritin. The structure is located in the midbrain tegmentum next to the substantia nigra and comprises caudal magnocellular and rostral parvocellular components. The red nucleus and substantia nigra are subcortical centers of the extrapyramidal motor system.

== Function ==
In a vertebrate without a significant corticospinal tract, gait is mainly controlled by the red nucleus. However, in primates, where the corticospinal tract is dominant, the rubrospinal tract may be regarded as vestigial in motor function. Therefore, the red nucleus is less important in primates than in many other mammals. Nevertheless, the crawling of babies is controlled by the red nucleus, as is arm swinging in typical walking. The red nucleus may play an additional role in controlling muscles of the shoulder and upper arm via projections of its magnocellular part. In humans, the red nucleus also has limited control over hands, as the rubrospinal tract is more involved in large muscle movement such as that for the arms (but not for the legs, as the tract terminates in the superior thoracic region of the spinal cord). Fine control of the fingers is not modified by the functioning of the red nucleus but relies on the corticospinal tract. The majority of red nucleus axons do not project to the spinal cord but, via its parvocellular part, relay information from the motor cortex to the cerebellum through the inferior olivary complex, an important relay center in the medulla.

== Input and output ==
The red nucleus receives many inputs from the cerebellum (interposed nucleus and the lateral cerebellar nucleus) of the opposite side and an input from the motor cortex of the same side.

The red nucleus has two sets of efferents:

- In humans, the majority of the output goes to the bundle of fibers continues through the medial tegmental field toward the inferior olive of the same side, to form part of a pathway that ultimately influence the cerebellum.
- The other output (the rubrospinal projection) goes to the rhombencephalic reticular formation and spinal cord of the opposite side, making up the rubrospinal tract, which runs ventral to the lateral corticospinal tract. As stated earlier, the rubrospinal tract is more important in non-primate species: in primates, because of the well-developed cerebral cortex, the corticospinal tract has taken over the role of the rubrospinal.

== Additional images ==
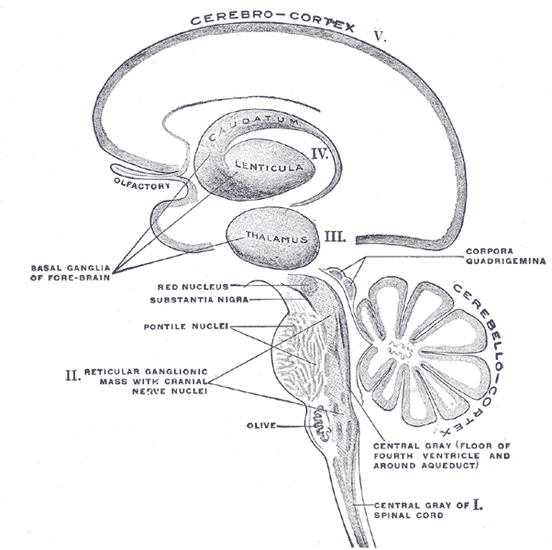
Schematic representation of the chief ganglionic categories (I to V).

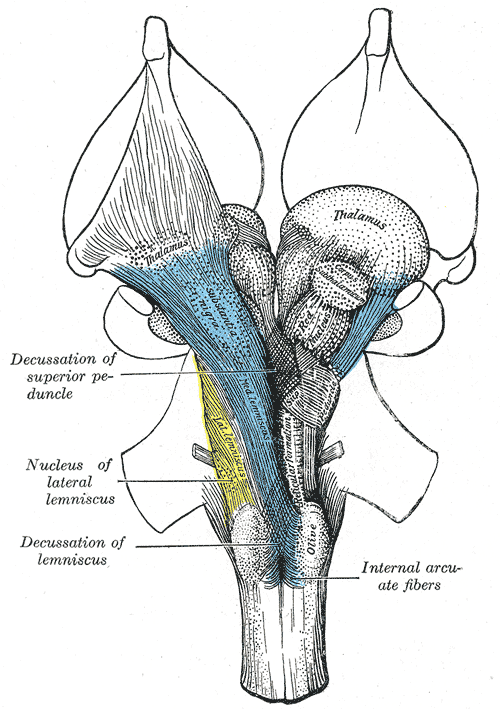
Deep dissection of brain-stem. Ventral view.

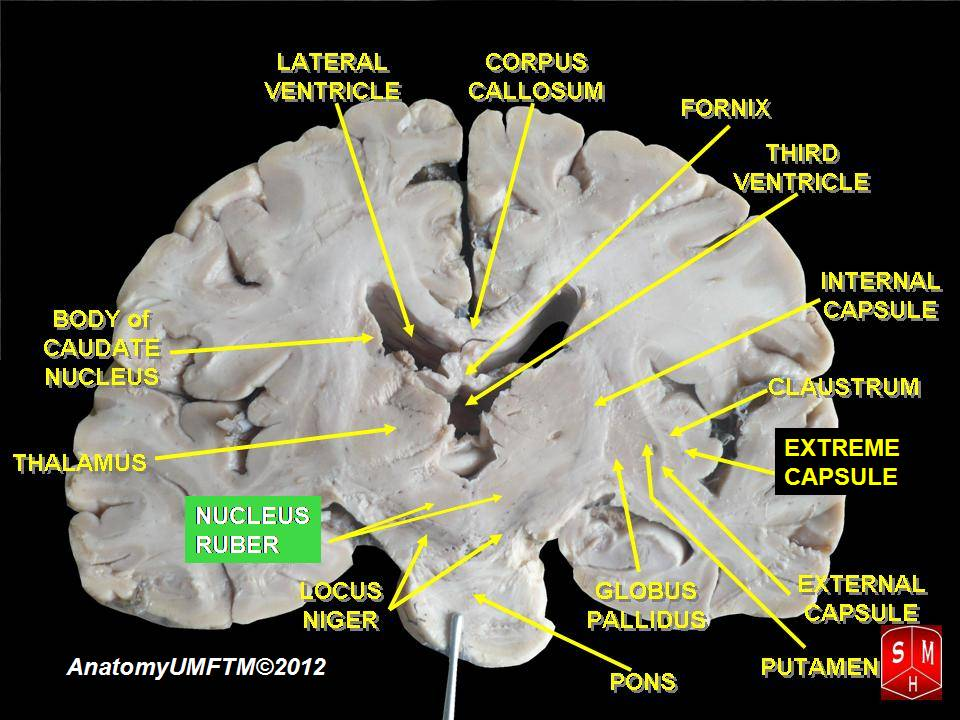
Red nucleus

== See also ==
- List of regions in the human brain
