= Descending neuron =

A descending neuron is a neuron that conveys signals from the brain to neural circuits in the spinal cord (vertebrates) or ventral nerve cord (invertebrates). As the sole conduits of information between the brain and the body, descending neurons play a key role in behavior. Their activity can initiate, maintain, modulate, and terminate behaviors such as locomotion. Because the number of descending neurons is several orders of magnitude smaller than the number of neurons in either the brain or spinal cord/ventral nerve cord, this class of cells represents a critical bottleneck in the flow of information from sensory systems to motor circuits.

== Anatomy ==
Descending neurons have their somas and dendrites (primary input zones) in the brain. Their axons traverse the neck in connectives, or tracts, and output onto neurons in the spinal cord (vertebrates) or ventral nerve cord (invertebrates).

Schematic of major descending pathways in mammals. The corticospinal and corticobulbar tracts are pyramidal tracts controlling voluntary movement. The tectospinal, rubrospinal, vestibulospinal, and reticulospinal tracts are extrapyramidal tracts controlling involuntary movement.

Mammals possess hundreds of thousands of descending neurons. They can be divided functionally into two major pathways: pyramidal tracts, which originate in the motor cortex, and extrapyramidal tracts, which originate in the brainstem (see schematic). An example of the former is the corticospinal tract, which is responsible for voluntary movement of the body. An example of the latter is the reticulospinal tract, which contributes to the unconscious regulation of locomotion and posture. Reticulospinal neurons originate in the medullary reticular formation, where they receive information from upstream locomotor centers, such as the mesencephalic locomotor region and the basal ganglia.

Side-view schematic of major descending pathways in Drosophila melanogaster. In the ventral nerve chord, the major pathways target the dorsal wing, neck, and haltere neuropils, the ventral leg neuropils, and the intermediate tectulum, an integrative region. Adapted from Namiki et al. (2018).

Insects possess only several hundreds of descending neurons. Work in the fruit fly Drosophila melanogaster suggests that they are organized into three broad pathways (see schematic). Two direct pathways link specific regions in the brain to motor circuits in the ventral nerve cord controlling the legs and wings, respectively. A third pathway couples a broad array of brain regions to a large integrative region in the ventral nerve cord that may control both sets of appendages.

== Function ==
Descending neurons play an important role in initiating, maintaining, modulating, and terminating behaviors. Several descending neurons involved in controlling specific behaviors have been identified in both vertebrates and invertebrates. These include descending neurons that can initiate and terminate locomotion, modulate locomotion speed and direction, and help coordinate limbs.

While some descending neurons are sufficient to elicit specific behaviors, most behaviors are likely not controlled by single, command-like descending neurons, but instead by the combined activity of different descending neurons.

Some descending pathways form direct connections with motor neurons and premotor interneurons, including central pattern generators. But how exactly descending signals are integrated in circuits in the spinal cord (vertebrates) or ventral nerve cord (invertebrates) during behavior is not well understood.

== See also ==
- Pyramidal tracts
- Extrapyramidal tracts
- Command neuron
- Reticular formation
