= Anterolateral corticospinal tract =

Part of the spinal cord

Anterolateral corticospinal tract is a subdivision of the corticospinal tract in the spinal cord. It is formed by approximately 2% of the corticospinal fibers that do not cross to the opposite side of the brainstem in the pyramidal decussation. This tract descends in the lateral white column anterior to the lateral corticospinal tract.

== See also ==
- Anterolateral system
