= Neural substrate of locomotor central pattern generators in mammals =

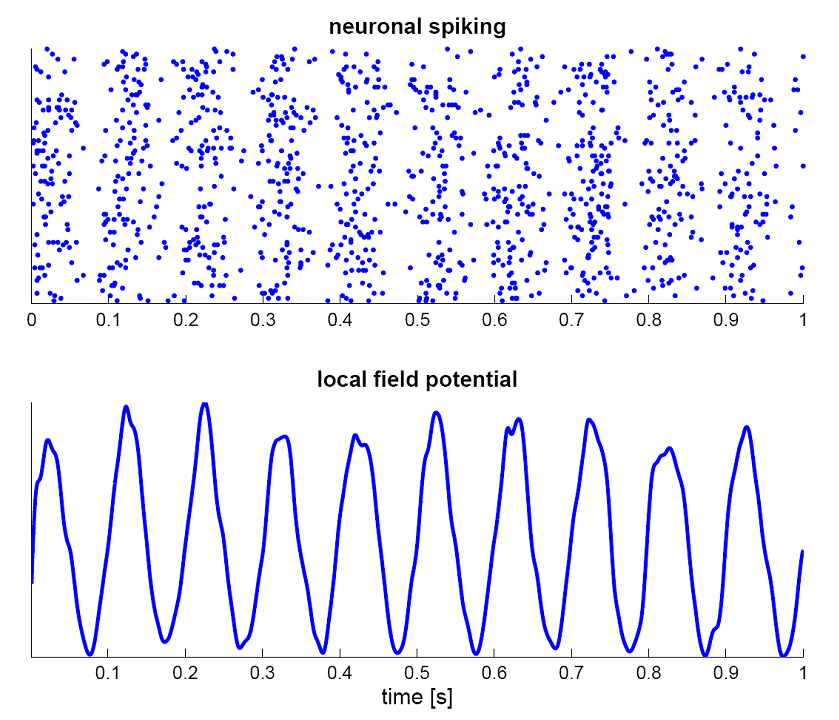
Neural oscillatory output

Central pattern generators are biological neural networks organized to produce any rhythmic output without requiring a rhythmic input. In mammals, locomotor CPGs are organized in the lumbar and cervical segments of the spinal cord, and are used to control rhythmic muscle output in the arms and legs. Certain areas of the brain initiate the descending neural pathways that ultimately control and modulate the CPG signals. In addition to this direct control, there exist different feedback loops that coordinate the limbs for efficient locomotion and allow for the switching of gaits under appropriate circumstances.

== General anatomy and physiology ==
=== Significant brain regions ===
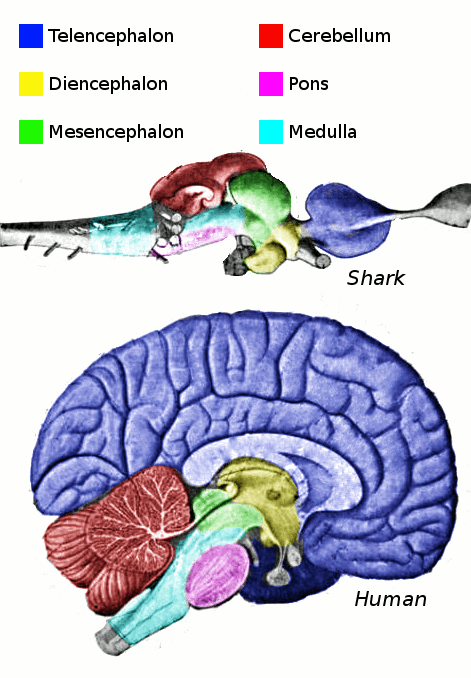
Human brain regions

Locomotion can be initiated by pathways that originate in the caudal hindbrain and brainstem and descend to the spinal cord. These descending pathways originate in the Mesencephalic Locomotor Region (MLR) and the lateral hypothalamus. These areas project to reticulospinal neurons in the pons and medulla, which themselves project throughout the spinal cord to activate the CPGs involved in locomotion. In particular, the reticular formation in the pons plays an important role in inducing locomotion. The parapyramidal region (PPR) in the ventral medulla is also known to produce locomotion when stimulated in neonatal rats. Several different command pathways play a role in the initiation of locomotion. Neurons involved in each of these include glutamatergic, noradrenergic (NA), dopaminergic (DA), and serotonergic (5-HT) neurons.

=== Spinal cord ===
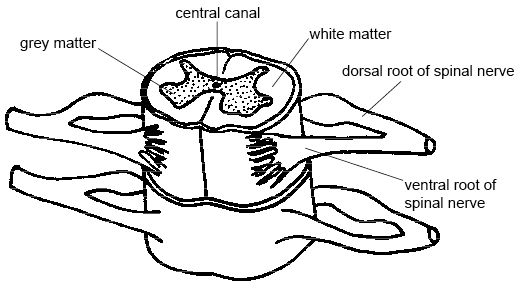
Spinal cord segment

The central pattern generators responsible for locomotion in vertebrates reside as half-center modules in the cervical and lumbar region of the spinal cord. Each CPG generates a basic motor output pattern that is responsible for the rhythmic contractions of flexor-extensor muscles that correspond to the forelimbs and hindlimbs. There exist neural substrates that control bilateral limb coordination, particularly in the lumbar spinal circuits controlling the hindlimbs of quadruped mammals. Rhythmogenic potential is highest in the center of the spinal cord and decreases in a mediolateral direction. The ability to generate fast and regular rhythmic activity decreases in the caudal direction, but the rhythm-generating networks extends from the lumbar region into the caudal thoracic region of the spinal cord. Both lateral and ventral funiculi are able to coordinate activity in the rostral and caudal regions. Although CPGs do exist in humans, supraspinal structures are also important for the additional demands of bipedal locomotion. There are different functional networks controlling forward and backward movement, as well as different circuits controlling each leg. These networks are largely nonoverlapping, although some feedback does exist between them.

== Significant neuron types ==
Basic Neuron

=== Glutamatergic ===
A study of neonatal rats demonstrated the significance of glutamatergic neurons, particularly those containing the Vglut2 transporter, in the rhythmic generation of the locomotor CPG. These neurons are located throughout the reticular formation as well as the lumbar ventral roots of the spinal cord. Stimulating the MLR produces postsynaptic potentials (PSP) in motoneurons with an average conduction velocity of 88 m/s, which indicates that this is a myelinated glutamatergic pathway. The PSPs are produced by the same spinal interneurons as those activating the motoneurons. NMDA receptors elicit voltage oscillations in regions of the spinal cord where locomotor neurons are located. They are in cells that express the HB9 transcription factor, which were shown to be rhythmically active during fictive locomotion in the mouse spinal cord.

=== Serotonergic ===
The supralumbar segments of the spinal cord are the most effective site for 5-HT to induce locomotion in the neonatal rat. 5-HT elicits locomotion in the spinal cord when applied to the thoracic cord, as well as directly to the upper lumbar segments of the spinal cord. More specifically, the serotonergic descending pathway originates in the parapyramidal region (PPR) of the medulla. Brainstem evoked locomotion can be blocked by 5-HT_{2A} and 5-HT_{7} receptor antagonists. Neurons containing these receptors are concentrated in different rostro-caudal regions. The former are concentrated below the L2 segment, while the latter are concentrated above the L3 segment. Neurons containing 5-HT_{7} affect the step cycle duration of the oscillation and the locomotor pattern. Neurons containing 5-HT_{2A} affect the amplitude of the ventral root discharges. This is consistent with premotor cells involved in recruiting motoneurons during locomotor-like activity.

=== Inhibitory ===
GABAergic and glycinergic neurons are both involved in both bilateral limb coordination and rostrocaudal coordination. When inhibitory activity is blocked between neurons, rhythmic activity still occurs. However, this activity is not indicative of locomotion. Thus, inhibitory neurons do not play a significant role in the generation of the rhythmic signal of CPGs, but instead modulate the signal to result in effective locomotion.

== Feedback and modulation ==
Basic feedback loop

=== Coordination between limbs ===
There exists significant coordination between the central pattern generators actuating individual limbs in mammals. There is both excitatory and inhibitory feedback between the left and right flexor and extensor ventral roots of a given spinal cord segment. There also exists a caudorostral excitability gradient that mediates interlimb coordination between the lumbar and cervical CPGs. This is largely single direction feedback, with the lumbar generators affecting the cervical generators, but not vice versa. This longitudinal feedback occurs both because of direct projections of lumbar neurons to cervical neurons, but also because of intermediate projections throughout the thoracic segments of the spinal cord. These thoracic segments are not simply passive elements in the network, but are rhythmically active with the lumbar generators.

=== Sensory feedback ===
Sensory feedback is used to modulate the signal of CPGs to allow animals to adapt to changes in the environment or circumstances. This feedback usually results from visual or touch cues, but can result from any sort of perception requiring a change of gait. In most cases, the specific neural structure for this type of feedback is not yet known. However, touch feedback of CPGs have been shown to be involved in the recovery of a symmetric gait in the hindlimbs of cats after complete spinal cord injuries. The hindlimb CPGs underwent plastic changes after injury, and after locomotor treadmill training any asymmetries in gait disappeared and bilateral locomotion was achieved.

A change of gait also results from a change in the signal of CPGs. However, there is an asymmetry in the control of cycle periods in the spinal rhythm generator. The cycle period of fictive locomotion in decerebrate cats is predominantly altered by modifying the extension phase, rather than the flexion phase. Recordings from lateral gastrocnemius-soleus extensor nerve and tibialis anterior flexion nerve were taken to demonstrate this control scheme. However, as this asymmetric control is observed without phasic sensory feedback, supraspinal structures, pharmacology, or sustained simulation, then a number of systems can potentially modulate the generator to produce different modes of phase-cycle period changes.
