= STG =

STG may refer to:

== Arts and entertainment ==
- Star Trek Generations, a 1995 sci-fi film
- Strike Gunner S.T.G, a 1991 arcade video game

== Governments ==
- Syrian transitional government

== Military ==
- Sonar Technician surface, a United States Navy rating
- Sturmgewehr (StG), a German assault rifle
- Sturzkampfgeschwader (StG), in Organization of the Luftwaffe (1933–45)

== Organizations ==
- School of Transnational Governance, of the European University Institute
- Security Threat Group, a prison gang
- Somali Telecom Group, a Somalian telecommunications company
- Scandinavian Tobacco Group, a Danish cigar and tobacco company
- Special Tactics Group, a New Zealand Police counter-terrorism unit
- Slaves to Gravity, a British band
- Symphony Technology Group, an American private equity firm

== Science, technology and mathematics ==
- Superior temporal gyrus in the human brain
- Stomatogastric ganglion in arthropods
- Steam turbine generator, an electric generator
- Spineless Tagless G-machine in the Glasgow Haskell Compiler
- Signal Transition Graph, a special type of Petri net

== Other uses ==
- As a historical abbreviation of "Sterling", the currency of the United Kingdom (more widely known as the Pound sterling)
- St. George Airport (Alaska), US, by IATA code
- Stirling railway station, Scotland, by station code
- Shoot 'em up, video game genre
- University of Toronto St. George, with "St. George" occasionally abbreviated as "STG"
