= Stomatogastric nervous system =

Neural network in arthropods

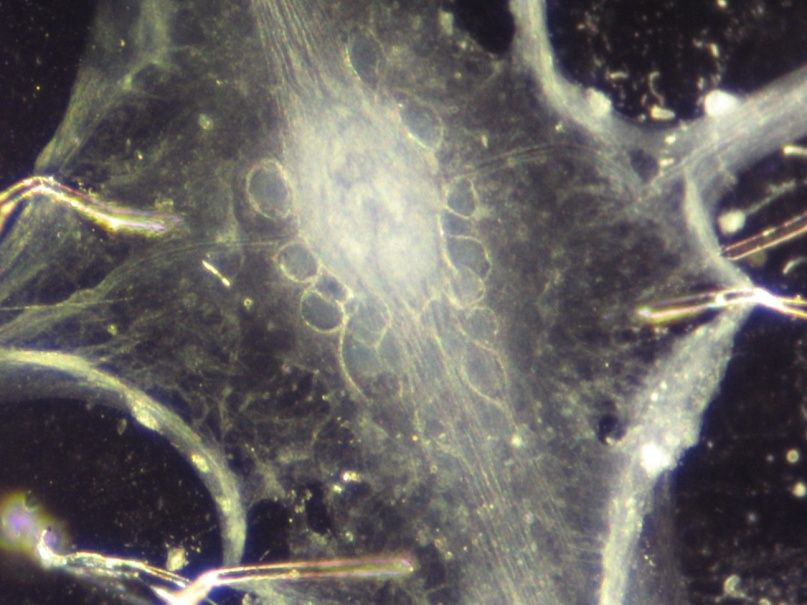
The photo shows the stomatogastric ganglion (STG) of a Jonah crab (Cancer borealis), taken by Marie Suver (California Institute of Technology; with permission) during the Neural Systems & Behavior course at the Marine Biological Laboratory in Woods Hole, MA. The STG contains the somata of 26 neurons that belong to two central pattern generating neural circuits (gastric mill and pyloric circuit)

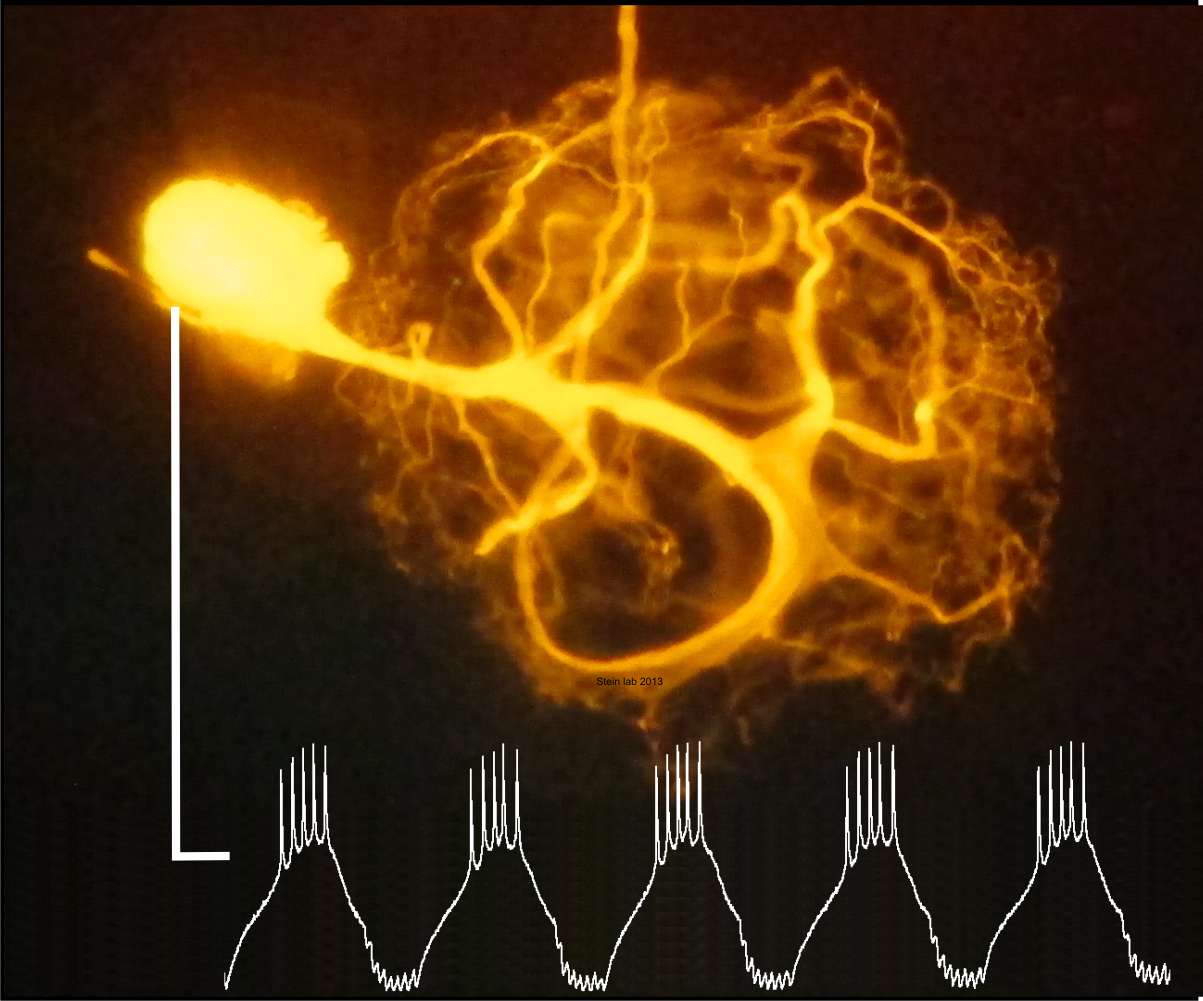
This photo shows the pyloric dilator neuron, a pacemaker neuron in the STG that was stained via intracellular injection of a fluorescent dye. The inset shows a recording of the rhythmic oscillations of the PD membrane potential. The recordings were taken by Christopher Goldsmith in the lab of Wolfgang Stein at Illinois State University.

The Stomatogastric Nervous System (STNS) is a commonly studied neural network composed of several ganglia in arthropods that controls the motion of the gut and foregut. The network of neurons acts as a central pattern generator. It is a model system for motor pattern generation because of the small number of cells, which are comparatively large and can be reliably identified. The system is composed of the stomatogastric ganglion (STG), oesophageal ganglion and the paired commissural ganglia.

Because of the many similarities between vertebrate and invertebrate systems, especially with regard to basic principles of neuronal function, invertebrate model systems such as the crustacean stomatogastric nervous system continue to provide key insight into how neural circuits operate in the numerically larger and less accessible vertebrate CNS.

Understanding how neuronal networks enable animals and humans to make coordinated movements is a continuing goal of neuroscience research. The stomatogastric nervous system of decapod crustaceans, which controls aspects of feeding, has contributed significantly to the general principles guiding our present understanding of how rhythmic motor circuits operate at the cellular level.

Rhythmic behaviors include all motor acts that at their core involve a rhythmic repeating set of movements. The circuits underlying such rhythmic behaviors, central pattern generators (CPGs), all operate on the same general principles. These networks remain rhythmic in the completely isolated nervous system, even in the absence of all rhythmic neuronal input, including feedback from sensory systems. Although the details differ in each circuit, all CPGs use the same set of cellular-level mechanisms for circuit construction. More importantly, CPG circuits are usually not dedicated to producing a single neuronal activity pattern. This flexibility results largely from the ability of different neuromodulators to change the cellular and synaptic properties of individual circuit neurons. When the properties of circuit components are changed, the output of the circuit itself is modified. These aspects of CPG operation are often shared by other circuits, enabling a general understanding of neuronal circuit operation.

The STNS contains a set of distinct but interacting motor circuits. The understanding of this multifunctional network contributed importantly to the general understanding of neural circuit operation. The value of this system has resulted from its accessibility, the use of several innovative techniques, and the combined research effort of around 15 laboratories over the past ~30 years.
