= Extrapyramidal system =

Connection between brain and spinal cord

- Medulla spinalis. (Extrapyramidal tracts are labeled as a group in red, at bottom left.)

Details

Identifiers
- Latin: systema extrapyramidale
- NeuroNames: 2070

In anatomy, the extrapyramidal system is a part of the motor system network causing involuntary actions. The system is called extrapyramidal to distinguish it from the tracts of the motor cortex that reach their targets by traveling through the pyramids of the medulla. The pyramidal tracts (corticospinal tract and corticobulbar tracts) may directly innervate motor neurons of the spinal cord or brainstem (anterior (ventral) horn cells or certain cranial nerve nuclei), whereas the extrapyramidal system centers on the modulation and regulation (indirect control) of anterior (ventral) horn cells.

== Extrapyramidal tracts ==
The extrapyramidal tracts are chiefly found in the reticular formation of the pons and medulla, and target lower motor neurons in the spinal cord that are involved in reflexes, locomotion, complex movements, and postural control. These tracts are in turn modulated by various parts of the central nervous system, including the nigrostriatal pathway, the basal ganglia, the cerebellum, the vestibular nuclei, and different sensory areas of the cerebral cortex. All of these regulatory components can be considered part of the extrapyramidal system, in that they modulate motor activity without directly innervating motor neurons.

The extrapyramidal tracts include parts of the following:

- rubrospinal tract: Conflicts between the motor commands sent by the cerebrum and body position information provided by the proprioceptors cause the cerebellum to stimulate the red nucleus of the midbrain. The red nucleus then sends corrective commands to the spinal cord along the rubrospinal tract.
- reticulospinal tract: connects the reticular system, a diffuse region of gray matter in the brain stem, to the spinal cord. It also contributes to muscle tone and influences autonomic functions.
- lateral vestibulospinal tract: Connects the brain stem nuclei of the vestibular system with the spinal cord. This allows posture, movement, and balance to be modulated on the basis of equilibrium information provided by the vestibular system.
- tectospinal tract: This tract projects from the midbrain to the spinal cord and is important for postural movements that are driven by the superior colliculus.

== See also ==
- List of regions in the human brain
- Extrapyramidal symptoms
- Rabbit syndrome, a rare extrapyramidal side effect
- Reticulospinal tract
- Tectospinal tract
- Vestibulospinal tract
