= Pyramidal signs =

In neurology, signs of dysfunction in the pyramidal tract

Pyramidal signs indicate that the pyramidal tract is affected at some point in its course. Pyramidal tract dysfunction can lead to various clinical presentations such as spasticity, weakness, slowing of rapid alternating movements, hyperreflexia, and a positive Babinski sign.

The pyramidal tract completes development and myelinization between 2 and 3 years of age. Pyramidal signs occur as a normal phenomena until the age of 2, when the myelinization is finished, and so under this age they aren't considered pathological.

== Pathophysiology ==
The upper motor neurons from the central nervous system descend through the pyramidal tracts (i.e., corticospinal tracts), connecting the brain and spinal cord and help in controlling voluntary movement of muscles.

== Irritative phenomena on the upper extremity ==
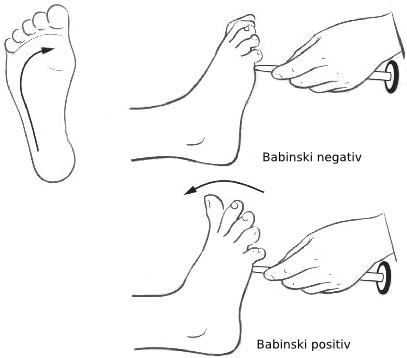
Babinski sign

The irritative phenomena are present if there is visible flection of the thumb, which goes to opposition:

- Hoffmann's sign – The patient's middle finger is flicked from the nail side down using the examiners index finger. (see video)
- Tromner's sign - The patient's middle finger is flicked from underneath using the examiner's index finger. (see video)
- Juster's sign – A sharp implement is pricked into the hypothenar eminence.

== Irritative phenomena on the lower extremity ==
=== Extension ===
Extension phenomena are positive if the great toe dorsiflexes (goes up) following the stimulus:

- Babinski reflex: The plantar aspect of the foot is gently stimulated in a line starting a few centimeters distal to the heel and extended to a point just behind the toes, and then turned medially across the transverse arch. This is done slowly over 5-6 seconds.
- Roche's sign: Similar to Babinski but done on the external part of the foot.
- Chaddock's phenomen: Reaction on sharp irritation on the outer ankle.
- Vitek's sign: Repeatedly scrape the tip of big toe.
- Oppenheim's phenomen: The periosteum of tibia is irritated with the examiners knuckles. (see video)
- Schäffer's phenomen: The Achilles tendon is kneaded.
- Gordon's phenomen: The triceps surae muscle is kneaded.

=== Flexion ===
These phenomena are positive if the toes of the foot flex:

- Rossolimo – The ball of the foot is struck using a tendon hammer. (see video)

== Clinical significance ==
Pyramidal signs can be a result from different types of damage to the brain or spinal cord, such as strokes, infections, tumors, hemorrhagic events, multiple sclerosis, or trauma.

Parkinsonian-Pyramidal syndrome (PPS) is a combination of both pyramidal and parkinsonian signs that manifest in various neurodegenerative diseases.

== See also ==
- Motor neurons
- Amyotrophic Lateral Sclerosis
- Reflexes
