= Tonic labyrinthine reflex =

Reflex found in newborn humans

- Other names: TLR
- Specialty: Pediatrics, Neurology
- Symptoms: Extension or flexion of limbs and trunk in response to head position
- Complications: Joint deformities, hip subluxation or dislocation
- Usual onset: Birth
- Duration: Typically integrates by 6 months of age
- Causes: Normal developmental reflex; persistence may indicate neurological disorder
- Risk factors: Cerebral palsy, developmental delays
- Diagnostic method: Clinical observation
- Treatment: Physical therapy, occupational therapy
- Frequency: Normal in newborns; abnormal if persists beyond infancy

The tonic labyrinthine reflex (TLR) is a primitive reflex found in newborn humans. With this reflex, tilting the head back (extension) while lying on the stomach causes the back to stiffen and even arch backwards, the legs to straighten, stiffen, and push together, the toes to point, the arms to straighten (not bend at the elbows and wrists, and the hands to become fisted or the fingers to curl). The reverse happens to arms and legs with neck flexion. The presence of this reflex beyond the newborn stage is also referred to as abnormal extension pattern or extensor tone.

The presence of the TLR as well as other primitive reflexes such as the asymmetrical tonic neck reflex (ATNR) beyond the first six months of life may indicate that the child has developmental delays and/or neurological abnormalities. For example, in people with cerebral palsy, the reflexes may persist and even be more pronounced. As abnormal reflexes, both the tonic labyrinthine reflex and the asymmetrical tonic neck reflex can cause problems for the growing child. The TLR and ATNR both hinder functional activities such as rolling, bringing the hands together, or even bringing the hands to the mouth. Over time, both the TLR and ATNR can cause serious damage to the growing child's joints and bones, causing the head of the femur to partially slip out of the acetabulum (subluxation) or completely move out of the acetabulum (dislocation).
