= Stomatogastric ganglion =

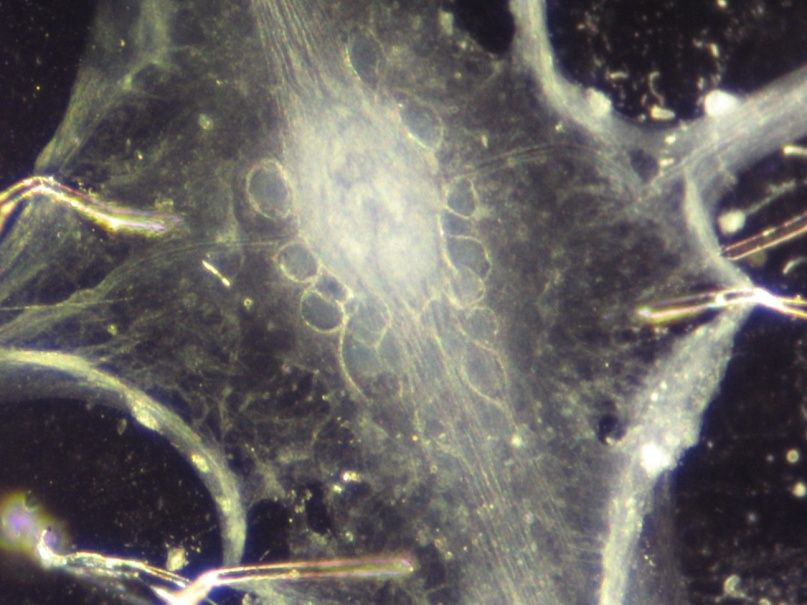
The stomatogastric ganglion of the crab Cancer borealis

The stomatogastric ganglion (STG) is a much-studied ganglion (collection of neurons) found in arthropods and studied extensively in decapod crustaceans. It is part of the stomatogastric nervous system.

== Anatomy ==
The neurons comprising the stomatogastric ganglion have cell bodies located dorsal to the stomach within the lumen of the ophthalmic artery. Most are motor neurons, with neurites that exit through motor nerves and innervate the muscles of the gastric mill and pylorus. These STG motor neurons also form direct synaptic connections with one another. In crabs and lobsters, in which it has been well-studied, the stomatogastric ganglion is a collection of approximately 25-30 neurons. The circuit varies slightly between different crustacean species and between individuals of the same species, but most of the neurons are conserved, and most stomatogastric muscles are innervated by just one motor neuron. The electrical and chemical synaptic connections between all of the STG neurons have been fully mapped and characterized, forming a complete wiring diagram (also called a connectome).

== Function ==
Neural activity in the stomatogastric ganglion produces rhythmic movements of the gastric mill and pyloric region of the digestive system. Neural circuits within the STG are prominent examples of central pattern generators, and their rhythm-generating properties have been studied in detail. The characteristic gastric mill rhythm and pyloric rhythm arise from the intrinsic electrophysiological properties of the neurons and from the strength of synaptic connections between neurons. The stomatogastric ganglion also receives many modulatory inputs. These neuromodulators, such as serotonin, dopamine, proctolin, FLRFamide-like peptides, and red pigment-concentrating hormone (RPCH) can change the speed and form of the rhythmic activity.

== See also ==
- Central pattern generator § Functions in invertebrates
- Stomatogastric nervous system
