= Mesencephalic locomotor region =

- The midbrain.

Details
- Part of: Brainstem

Identifiers
- Acronym(s): MLR

The mesencephalic locomotor region (MLR) is a functionally defined area of the midbrain that is associated with the initiation and control of locomotor movements in vertebrate species.

== Neuroanatomical organization ==
The MLR was first described by Shik and colleagues in 1966 when they observed that electrical stimulation of a region of the midbrain in decerebrate cats produced walking and running behavior on a treadmill. Twenty-eight years later, Masdeu and colleagues described the presence of a MLR in humans. It is now widely acknowledged that, along with other motor control centers of the brain, the MLR plays an active role in initiating and modulating the spinal neural circuitry to control posture and gait. Anatomically, as the name suggests, the MLR is located in the mesencephalon (or midbrain), ventral to the inferior colliculus and near the cuneiform nucleus. Although identifying the exact anatomical substrates of the MLR has been subject to considerable debate, the pedunculopontine nucleus (PPN), cuneiform nucleus, and midbrain extrapyramidal area are thought to form the neuroanatomical basis of the MLR. Nuclei within the MLR receive inputs from the substantia nigra of the basal ganglia and neural centers within the limbic system. Projections from the MLR descend via the medullary and pontine reticulospinal tracts to act on spinal motor neurons supplying the trunk and proximal limb flexors and extensors.

The PPN within the MLR is composed of a diverse population of neurons containing the neurotransmitters gamma-amino-butyric acid (GABA), glutamate, and acetylcholine (ACh). Results from animal and clinical studies suggest that cholinergic neurons in the PPN play a crucial role in modulating both the rhythm of locomotion and postural muscle tone. Glutamatergic and cholinergic inputs from the MLR may be responsible for regulating the excitability of reticulospinal neurons that in turn project to spinal central pattern generators to initiate stepping.

== Clinical significance ==
The integration of motor and sensory information during walking involves communication between cortical, subcortical, and spinal circuits. Step-like motor patterns of the lower extremities can be induced through activation of the spinal circuitry alone; however, supraspinal input is necessary for functional bipedal walking in humans. Pathologies of the nuclei within the MLR have been associated with a combination of clinical features that are unique to midbrain dysfunction and can be differentiated from other subcortical neurological conditions such as those associated with Parkinsonism and cerebellar lesions.

In a clinical case series, three adult males with isolated lesions of the MLR presented with gait hesitation and gait ataxia characterized by stepping that lacked uniform direction, amplitude, and rhythmicity. Although gait hesitation and ataxia are also clinical features of Parkinson's disease and lesions of the cerebellum, respectively, the authors noted that the patients did not display any other common signs or symptoms associated with these neurological conditions, suggesting that pathologies of the midbrain can produce gait disturbances even when cerebellar and basal ganglia function are intact. In a study investigating high-level gait and balance disorders in elderly adults who had no evidence of rheumatologic, orthopedic, or neurologic disease, brain imaging data revealed an association between reduced gray matter density of the PPN and cuneiform nucleus and impaired gait initiation, step execution, and postural control. Additionally, among eighteen individuals with Parkinson's disease who either did or did not experience freezing of gait, functional magnetic resonance imaging revealed reduced activity in the MLR and supplementary motor area among those individuals who experienced episodic gait hesitation. Freezing of gait has also been associated with functional reorganization of supraspinal locomotor networks whereby altered connectivity and communication between the supplementary motor area and MLR were observed. These findings suggest that the MLR does in fact play a unique role in human locomotion, especially with respect to step initiation and motor planning.

=== Deep brain stimulation ===
Given the role of the MLR in gait initiation and postural control, researchers and clinicians have investigated the effects of targeted deep brain stimulation (DBS) on gait disturbances in clinical populations. Plaha and Gill reported significant improvements in gait dysfunction and postural instability in two patients with advanced Parkinson's disease who were treated using DBS electrodes implanted in the region of the PPN. Likewise, in a more recent study, six patients with Parkinson's disease demonstrated improvements in posture, gait, and postural stability following 6 months of DBS to the PPN and subthalamic nucleus. Bachmann and colleagues applied DBS to the MLR in rats with chronic, incomplete spinal cord injury and reported improved hindlimb function and near normal restoration of locomotor function following treatment.

== See also ==
- List of regions in the human brain
- Central pattern generator
- Central nervous system
- Gait (human)
- Motor Control
- Brain
- Pedunculopontine nucleus
- Mesencephalon
