= Lateral corticospinal tract =

Largest part of the corticospinal tract

- Lateral corticospinal tract labeled in red at upper left.

Details
- Part of: Spinal cord
- System: Central nervous system

Identifiers
- Latin: tractus corticospinalis lateralis, fasciculus cerebrospinalis lateralis
- NeuroNames: 2954
- TA98: A14.1.02.219
- TA2: 6095
- FMA: 72635

The lateral corticospinal tract (also called the crossed pyramidal tract or lateral cerebrospinal fasciculus) is the largest part of the corticospinal tract. It extends throughout the entire length of the spinal cord, and on transverse section appears as an oval area in front of the posterior column and medial to the posterior spinocerebellar tract.

== Structure ==
Descending motor pathways carry motor signals from the brain down the spinal cord and to the target muscle or organ. They typically consist of an upper motor neuron and a lower motor neuron. The lateral corticospinal tract is a descending motor pathway that begins in the cerebral cortex, decussates in the pyramids of the lower medulla (also known as the medulla oblongata or the cervicomedullary junction, which is the most posterior division of the brain) and proceeds down the contralateral side of the spinal cord. It is the largest part of the corticospinal tract. It extends throughout the entire length of the medulla spinalis, and on transverse section appears as an oval area in front of the posterior column and medial to the posterior spinocerebellar tract.

== Function ==
Axons in the lateral corticospinal tract weave out of the tract and into the anterior horns of the spinal cord. It controls fine movement of ipsilateral limbs (albeit contralateral to the corresponding motor cortex) as it lies distal to the pyramidal decussation. Control of more central axial and girdle muscles comes from the anterior corticospinal tract.

Damage to different parts of the body will cause deficits, depending on whether the damage is above (rostral) or below (caudal) the pyramidal decussation. Damage to the body above the pyramidal decussation will cause contralateral motor deficits. For example, if there is a lesion at the pre-central gyrus in the right cerebral cortex, then the left side of the body will be affected. Whereas damage below the pyramidal decussation will result in ipsilateral motor deficits. For example, spinal cord damage on the left side of the lateral corticospinal tract at the thoracic level can cause motor deficits to the left side of the body.

== Clinical significance ==
Strokes, spinal muscular atrophy, Brown Sequard Syndrome, poliomyelitis and amyotrophic lateral sclerosis are all pathologies that could affect the lateral corticospinal tract. Damage to the lower motor neurons could pose a risk of muscle atrophy and other disorders.

== Additional images ==
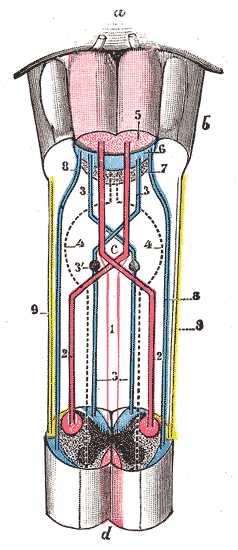
Decussation of pyramids.

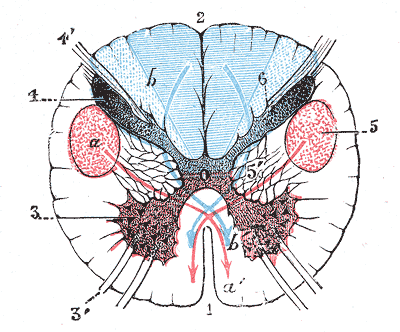
Section of the medulla oblongata through the lower part of the decussation of the pyramids

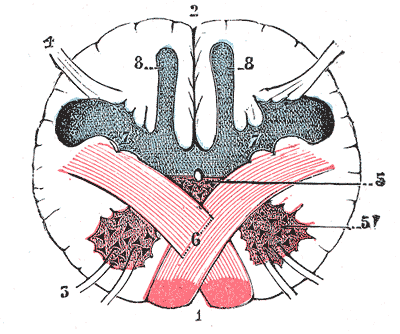
Section of the medulla oblongata at the level of the decussation of the pyramids.

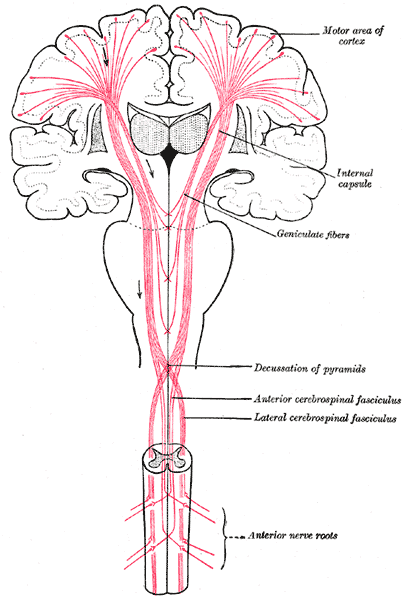
The motor tract.
