= Pyramidal tracts =

Central nervous system pathways

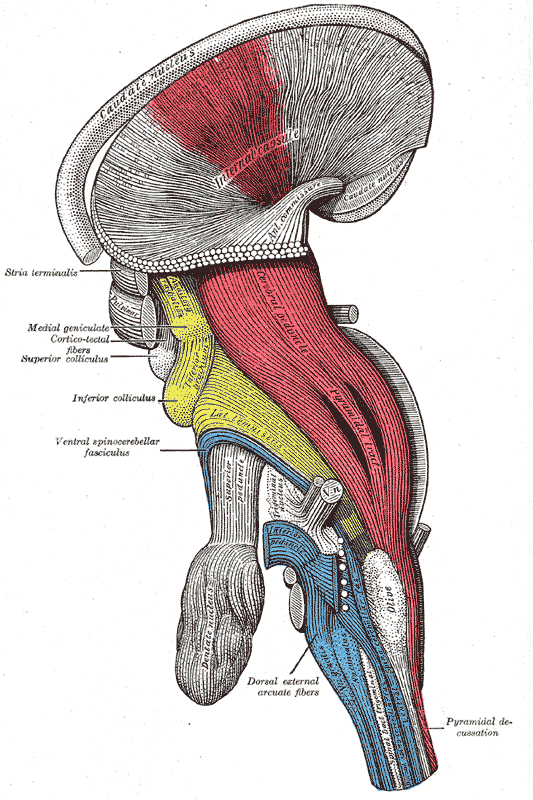
- Deep dissection of brain-stem. Lateral view. ("pyramidal tract" visible in red, and "pyramidal decussation" labeled at lower right.)

- Spinal cord tracts, with pyramidal tracts labeled at upper left

Details
- Decussation: Many fibres in the medullary pyramids
- From: Cerebral cortex
- To: Spinal cord (corticospinal) or brainstem (corticobulbar)

Identifiers
- Latin: tractus pyramidalis tractus corticospinalis
- MeSH: D011712
- NeuroNames: 1320
- NeuroLex ID: birnlex_1464
- TA98: A14.1.04.102; A14.1.06.102
- TA2: 6040
- FMA: 72634

The pyramidal tracts include both the corticobulbar tract and the corticospinal tract. These are aggregations of efferent nerve fibers from the upper motor neurons that travel from the cerebral cortex and terminate either in the brainstem (corticobulbar) or spinal cord (corticospinal) and are involved in the control of motor functions of the body.

The corticobulbar tract conducts impulses from the brain to the cranial nerves. These nerves control the muscles of the face and neck and are involved in facial expression, mastication, swallowing, and other motor functions.

The corticospinal tract conducts impulses from the brain to the spinal cord. It is made up of a lateral and anterior tract. The corticospinal tract is involved in voluntary movement. The majority of fibres of the corticospinal tract cross over in the medulla oblongata, resulting in muscles being controlled by the opposite side of the brain. The corticospinal tract contains the axons of the pyramidal cells, the largest of which are the Betz cells, located in the primary motor cortex.

The pyramidal tracts are named because they pass through the pyramids of the medulla oblongata. The corticospinal fibers converge to a point when descending from the internal capsule to the brain stem from multiple directions, giving the impression of an inverted pyramid. Involvement of the pyramidal tract at any level leads to pyramidal signs.

The myelination of the pyramidal fibres is incomplete at birth and gradually progresses in cranio-caudal direction and thereby progressively gaining functionality. Most of the myelination is complete by two years of age and thereafter it progresses very slowly in cranio-caudal direction up to twelve years of age.

== Structure ==
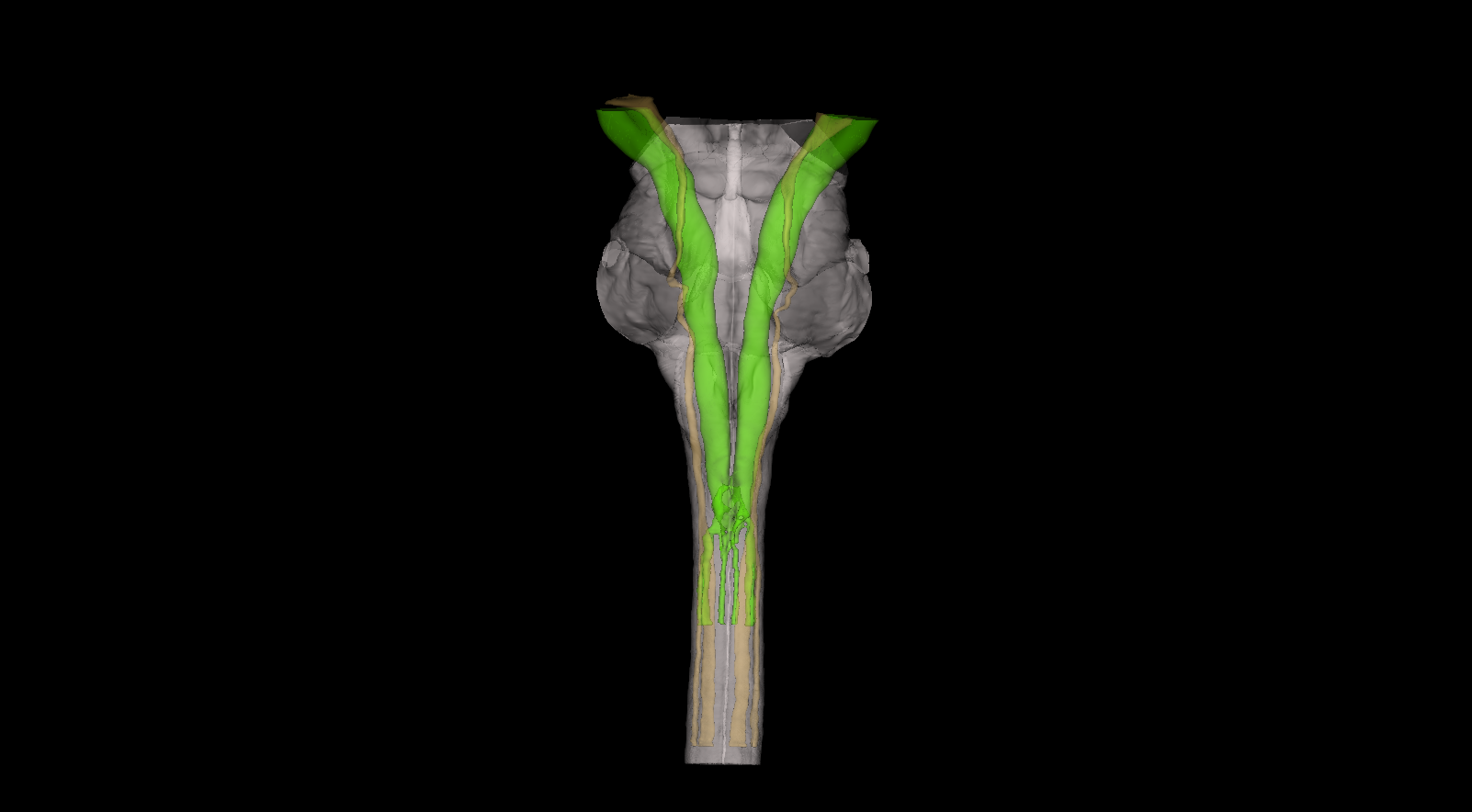
Pyramidal tracts

The term pyramidal tracts refers to upper motor neurons that originate in the cerebral cortex and terminate in the spinal cord (corticospinal) or brainstem (corticobulbar). Nerves emerge in the cerebral cortex, pass down and may cross sides in the medulla oblongata, and travel as part of the spinal cord until they synapse with interneurons in the grey column of the spinal cord.

There is some variation in terminology. The pyramidal tracts definitively encompass the corticospinal tracts, and many authors also include the corticobulbar tracts.

=== Corticospinal tract ===
Nerve fibres in the corticospinal tract originate from pyramidal cells in layer V of the cerebral cortex. Fibres arise from the primary motor cortex (about 30%), supplementary motor area and the premotor cortex (together also about 30%), and the somatosensory cortex, parietal lobe, and cingulate gyrus supplies the rest. The cells have their bodies in the cerebral cortex, and the axons form the bulk of the pyramidal tracts. The nerve axons travel from the cortex through the posterior limb of internal capsule, through the cerebral peduncle and into the brainstem and anterior medulla oblongata. Here they form two prominences called the medulla oblongatary pyramids. Below the prominences, the majority of axons cross over to the opposite side from which they originated, known as decussation. The axons that cross over move to the outer part of the medulla oblongata and form the lateral corticospinal tract, whereas the fibres that remain form the anterior corticospinal tract. About 80% of axons cross over and form the lateral corticospinal tract; 10% do not cross over and join the tract, and 10% of fibres travel in the anterior corticospinal tract.

The nerve axons traveling down the tract are the efferent nerve fibers of the upper motor neurons. These axons travel down the tracts in the white matter of the spinal cord until they reach the vertebral level of the muscle that they will innervate. At this point, the axons synapse with lower motor neurons. The majority of axons do not directly synapse with lower motor neurons, but instead synapse with an interneuron that then synapses with a lower motor neuron. This generally occurs in the anterior grey column. Nerve axons of the lateral corticospinal tract that did not cross over in the medulla oblongata do so at the level of the spinal cord they terminate in.

These tracts contain more than 1 million axons and the majority of the axons are myelinated. The corticospinal tracts myelinate largely during the first and second years after birth. The majority of nerve axons are small (<4μm) in diameter. About 3% of nerve axons have a much larger diameter (16μm) and arise from Betz cells, mostly in the leg area of the primary motor cortex. These cells are notable because of their rapid conduction rate, over 70m/sec, the fastest conduction of any signals from the brain to the spinal cord.

Horizontal section through the lower part of the pons, showing the fibers of the corticospinal tract (#19) passing through the pontine nuclei

=== Corticobulbar tract ===
Fibres from the ventral motor cortex travel with the corticospinal tract through the internal capsule, but terminate in a number of locations in the midbrain (cortico-mesencephalic tract), pons (Corticopontine tract), and medulla oblongata (cortico-bulbar tract). The upper motor neurons of the corticobulbar tract synapse with interneurons or directly with the lower motor neurons located in the motor cranial nerve nuclei, namely oculomotor, trochlear, motor nucleus of the trigeminal nerve, abducens, facial nerve and accessory and in the nucleus ambiguus to the hypoglossal, vagus and accessory nerves. These nuclei are supplied by nerves from both sides of the brain, with the exception of the parts of the facial nerve that control muscles of the lower face. These muscles are only innervated by nerves from the contralateral (opposite) side of the cortex.

== Function ==
The nerves within the corticospinal tract are involved in movement of muscles of the body. Because of the crossing-over of fibres, muscles are supplied by the side of the brain opposite to that of the muscle. The nerves within the corticobulbar tract are involved in movement in muscles of the head. They are involved in swallowing, phonation, and movements of the tongue. By virtue of involvement with the facial nerve, the corticobulbar tract is also responsible for transmitting facial expression. With the exception of lower muscles of facial expression, all functions of the corticobulbar tract involve inputs from both sides of the brain.

The extrapyramidal system refers to tracts within the spinal cord involved in involuntary movement but not part of the pyramidal tracts. Their functions include the control of posture and muscle tone.

== Clinical significance ==
1. Damage to the fibres of the corticospinal tracts, anywhere along their course from the cerebral cortex to the lower end of the spinal cord, can cause an upper motor neuron syndrome.
2. A few days after the injury to the upper motor neurons, a pattern of motor signs and symptoms appears, including spasticity, hyperactive reflexes, a loss of the ability to perform fine movements, and an extensor plantar response known as the Babinski sign.
3. Symptoms generally occur alongside other sensory problems.
4. Causes may include disorders such as strokes, cerebral palsy, subdural hemorrhage, abscesses and tumours, neurodegenerative diseases such as multiple system atrophy, inflammation such as meningitis and multiple sclerosis, and trauma to the spinal cord, including from slipped discs.
5. If the corticobulbar tract is damaged on only one side, then only the lower face will be affected, however if there is involvement of both the left and right tracts, then the result is pseudobulbar palsy. This causes problems with swallowing, speaking, and emotional lability.
6. Severe disabling involuntary movements such as hemiballismus or severe chorea might exhaust the patient and become a life-threatening situation.
7. In the past, this condition was treated by partial section of the pyramidal tract either at the primary motor cortex or at the cerebral crus (pedunculotomy).

== Additional images ==
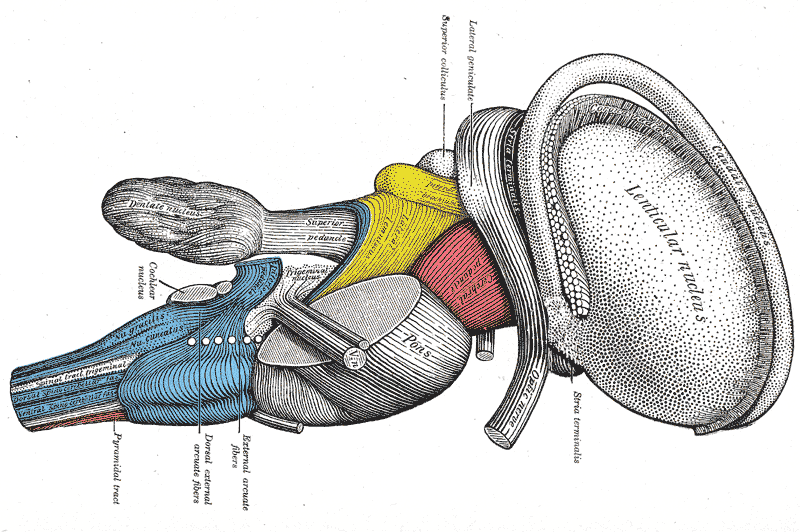
Dissection of brain-stem. Lateral view.

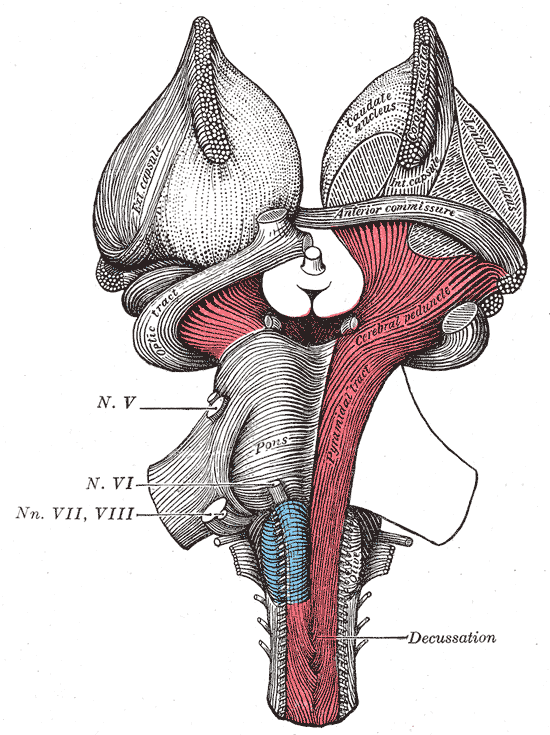
Superficial dissection of brain-stem. Ventral view.

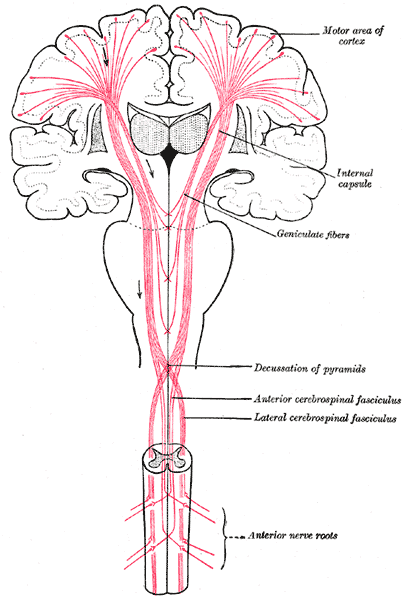
The motor tract.

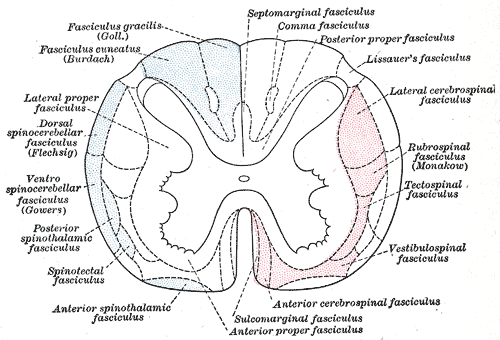
Diagram of the principal fasciculi of the spinal cord, from Gray's anatomy

== In popular culture ==
In National Lampoon's European Vacation, the Griswold family wins a vacation on a game show called Pig in a Poke when their opponents fail to correctly answer a question about the pyramidal tracts, despite Clark Griswold (played by Chevy Chase) mistakenly answering that they are a housing development outside Cairo.
