= Medullary pyramids (brainstem) =

White matter structures within the brainstem's medulla oblongata

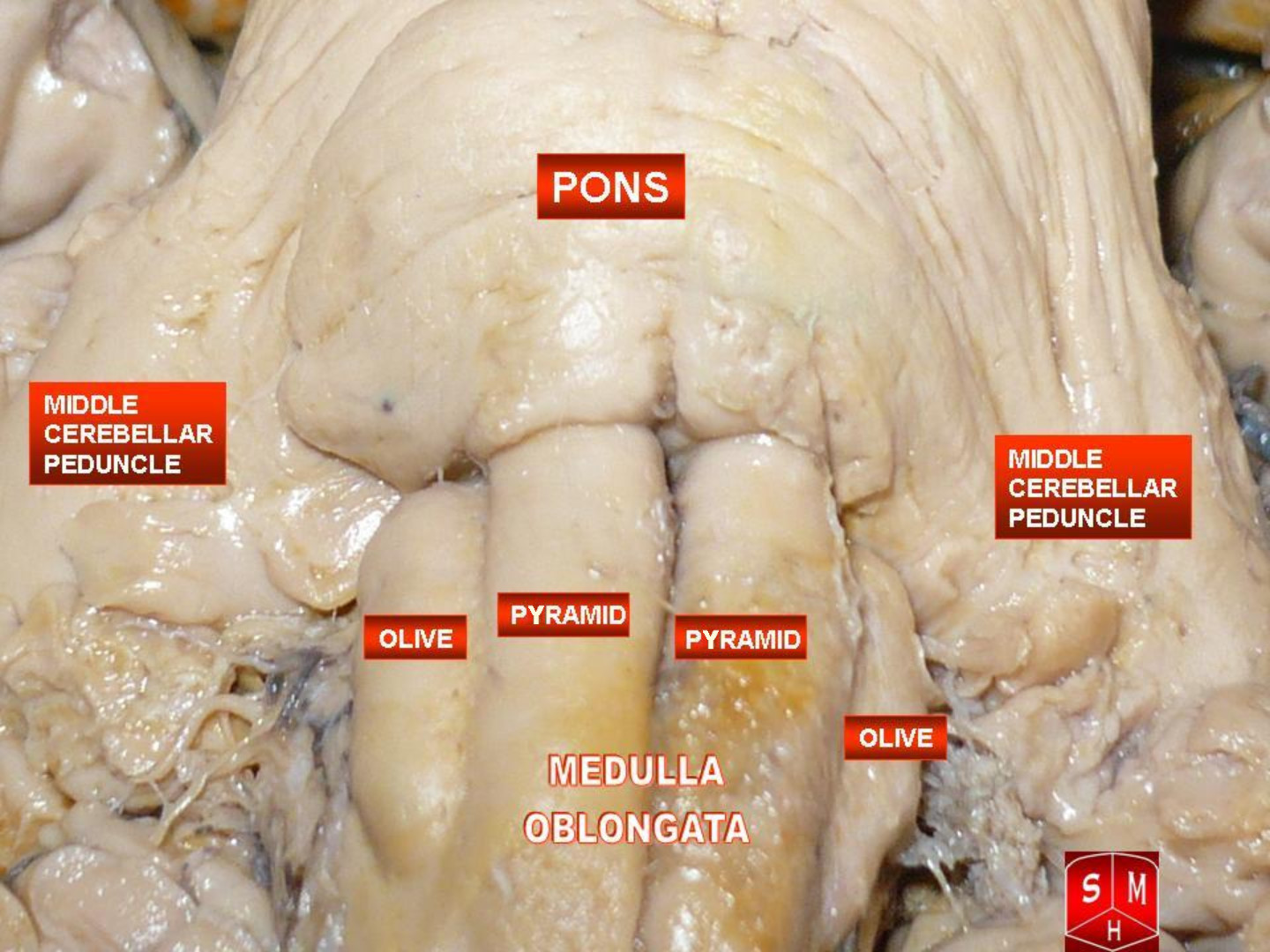
- Pons and medulla oblongata. Anterior surface. (Pyramids visible at center.)

- Animation. Pyramids shown in green.

Details

Identifiers
- Latin: pyramis medullae oblongatae
- NeuroNames: 705
- TA98: A14.1.04.003
- TA2: 5985
- FMA: 75254

In neuroanatomy, the medullary pyramids are paired white matter structures of the brainstem's medulla oblongata that contain motor fibers of the corticospinal and corticobulbar tracts – known together as the pyramidal tracts. The lower limit of the pyramids is marked when the fibers cross (decussate).

== Structure ==
The ventral portion of the medulla oblongata contains the medullary pyramids. These two ridge-like structures travel along the length of the medulla oblongata and are bordered medially by the anterior median fissure. They each have an anterolateral sulcus along their lateral borders, where the hypoglossal nerve emerges from. Also at the side of each pyramid there is a pronounced bulge known as an olive. Fibers of the posterior column, which transmit sensory and proprioceptive information, are located behind the pyramids on the medulla oblongata.

The medullary pyramids contain motor fibers that are known as the corticobulbar and corticospinal tracts. The corticospinal tracts are on the anterior surface of the pyramids. These tracts transport motor signals that originated in the precentral gyrus and travelled through the internal capsule to the medulla oblongata and pyramids. Extrapyramidal tracts are those motor tracts that do not traverse the medullary pyramids.

At the pyramids' most caudal end, the corticospinal axons decussate (or cross over) the midline and continue down the spinal cord on the contralateral side. The fibers that decussated will go down the lateral corticospinal tract while the fibers that did not decussate will travel down the anterior corticospinal tract. Nearly 90 percent of the fibers decussate and travel down the lateral corticospinal tract while the other 10 percent travels down the anterior corticospinal tract.

=== Decussation ===
The two pyramids contain the motor fibers that pass from the brain to the medulla oblongata and spinal cord. These are the corticobulbar and corticospinal fibers that make up the pyramidal tracts.

About 90% of these fibers leave the pyramids in successive bundles and decussate (cross over) in the anterior median fissure of the medulla oblongata as the pyramidal decussation or motor decussation. Having crossed over at the middle line, they pass down in the posterior part of the lateral funiculus as the lateral corticospinal tract. The other 10% of the fibers stay uncrossed in the anterior corticospinal tract. The pyramidal decussation marks the border between the spinal cord and the medulla oblongata.

== Function ==
The medullary pyramids contain the motor fibers of the pyramidal tracts – the corticospinal and corticobulbar tracts, which are responsible for movement of muscles.

== Clinical significance ==
Whiplash as a result of a car accident can lead to brainstem injuries that affect the pyramids at the medulla oblongata. These pyramid injuries are usually a result of a dislocation at the occiput or spinal level C1. Injuries to the pyramids of the medulla oblongata can also be caused by the quick hyperextension of the neck (cervical region of the spine). Hyperextension of the neck can pull and tear the pyramids, leading to a variety of symptoms such as weakness in all four limbs, difficulty swallowing, and difficulty speaking. A bilateral infarction in the pyramids of the medulla can result in motor quadriplegia. This is rare, however, as there have only been four cases of this reported.

== Additional images ==
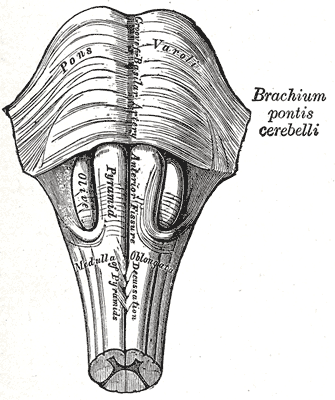
Medulla oblongata and pons. Anterior surface. (Pyramid visible at center.)

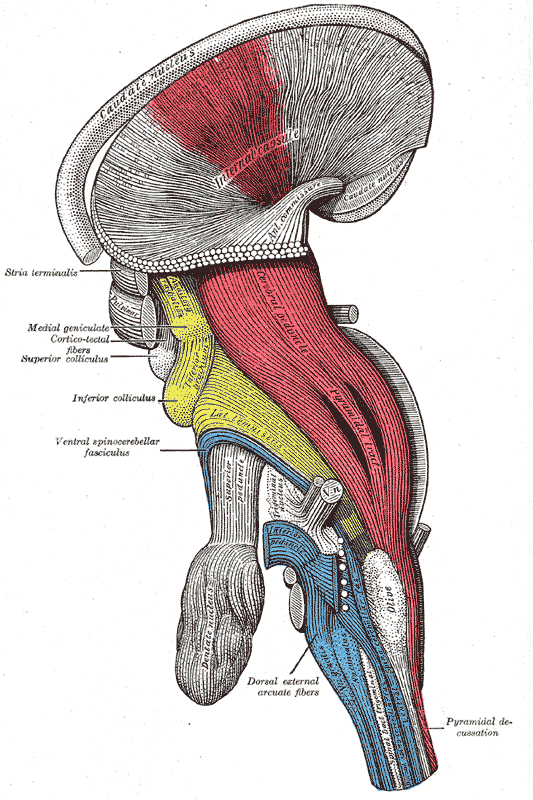
Sketch of the brainstem, with the pyramidal tract visible in red, and pyramidal decussation labeled at lower right.

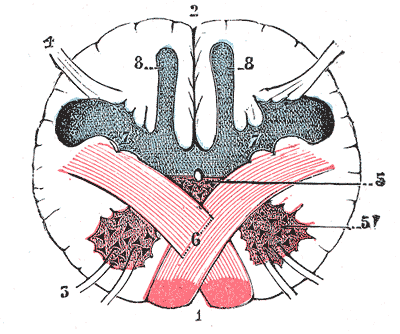
Section of the medulla oblongata at the level of the decussation of the pyramids.

== See also ==
- Corticospinal tract
