= Lateral vestibulospinal tract =

Spinal tract

- Vestibulospinal tract is 2c, in red at bottom center.

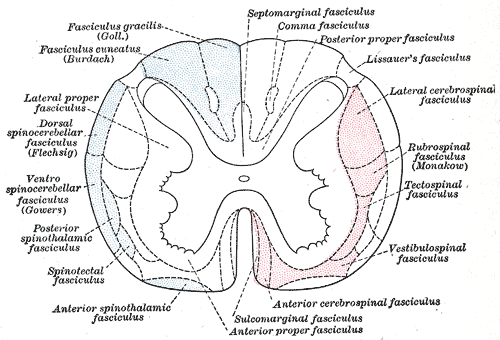
- Diagram of the principal fasciculi of the spinal cord.

Details

Identifiers
- Latin: tractus vestibulospinalis lateralis
- TA98: A14.1.02.206; A14.1.04.131
- TA2: 6113
- FMA: 73974

The lateral vestibulospinal tract is one of the descending spinal tracts of the ventromedial funiculus.

The lateral part of the vestibulospinal tract is the major portion and is composed of fibers originating in the lateral, superior, and inferior vestibular nuclei (primarily the lateral). It projects ipsilaterally down to the lumbar region of the spinal cord. There it helps to maintain an upright and balanced posture by stimulating extensor motor neurons in the legs. It also innervates muscles of the trunk, thus additionally aiding in body posture and balance. The lateral vestibular nuclei receive input from cerebellum, particularly the vestibulocerebellum, or the flocculi and nodulus. The cerebellum aids in coordinating postural adjustments.

== See also ==
- Decerebrate posturing
