= Tectospinal tract =

Brain and spinal cord neural tract

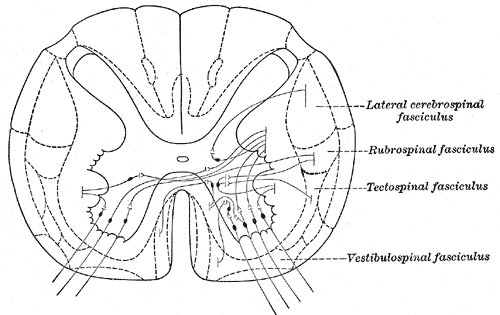
- Diagram showing possible connection of long descending fibers from higher centers with the motor cells of the ventral column through association fibers. ("Tectospinal fasciculus" labeled at center right.)

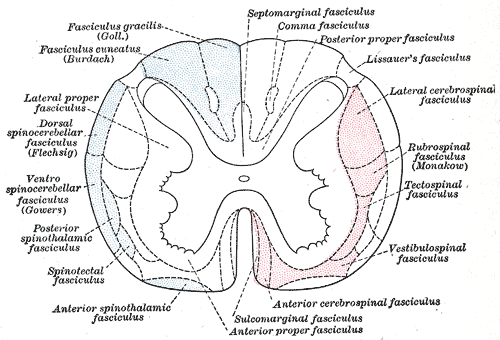
- Diagram of the principal fasciculi of the spinal cord. ("Tectospinal fasciculus" labeled at center right, in red.)

Details

Identifiers
- Latin: tractus tectospinalis
- MeSH: D065844
- NeuroLex ID: birnlex_759
- TA98: A14.1.02.211; A14.1.04.112
- TA2: 6119
- FMA: 72620

In humans, the tectospinal tract (or colliculospinal tract) is a decussating extrapyramidal tract that coordinates head/neck and eye movements.

It arises from the superior colliculus of the mesencephalic (midbrain) tectum, and projects to the cervical and upper thoracic spinal cord levels. It mediates reflex turning of the head and upper trunk in the direction of startling sensory stimuli (visual, auditory, or skin).

It arises from the deep layers of the superior colliculus. It decussates within the posterior part of mesencephalic tegmentum at the level of the red nucleus. It descends through the medulla oblongata near the midline within the medial longitudinal fasciculus. In the spinal cord, it descends in the anterior funiculus. It terminates by synapsing with interneurons of the intermediate zone and anterior grey column.

== See also ==
- Spinotectal tract
- Upper motor neuron
