= Central pattern generator =

Biological neural circuit that produces rhythmic outputs in the absence of rhythmic input

Central pattern generators (CPGs) are self-organizing biological neural circuits that produce rhythmic outputs in the absence of rhythmic input. They are the source of the tightly-coupled patterns of neural activity that drive rhythmic and stereotyped motor behaviors like walking, swimming, breathing, or chewing. The ability to function without input from higher brain areas still requires modulatory inputs, and their outputs are not fixed. Flexibility in response to sensory input is a fundamental quality of CPG-driven behavior. To be classified as a rhythmic generator, a CPG requires:

1. "two or more processes that interact such that each process sequentially increases and decreases, and
2. that, as a result of this interaction, the system repeatedly returns to its starting condition."

CPGs are found in humans and most other vertebrates, and in some invertebrates.

== Physiology ==
=== CPG neurons ===
Intrinsic properties of CPG neurons. Adapted from Marder and Bucher (2001).

CPG neurons can have different intrinsic membrane properties (see schematic). Some neurons fire bursts of action potentials, either endogenously or in the presence of neuromodulatory substances. Other neurons are bistable and generate plateau potentials that can be triggered by a depolarizing current pulse, and terminated by a hyperpolarizing current pulse. Many CPG neurons fire after being released from inhibition (postinhibitory rebound). Another common feature of CPG neurons is a decrease in the frequency of firing during a constant depolarization (spike frequency adaptation).

=== Rhythm generation ===
Mechanisms of rhythm generation in CPGs. Adapted from Marder and Bucher (2001).

Rhythm generation in CPG networks depends on the intrinsic properties of CPG neurons and their synaptic connections. There are two general mechanisms for rhythm generation: pacemaker/follower and reciprocal inhibition (see schematic).

In a network driven by a pacemaker, one or more neurons act as a core oscillator (pacemaker) that drives other, non-bursting neurons (follower) into a rhythmic pattern. Examples of pacemaker driven networks include the pyloric rhythm of the crustacean stomatogastric ganglion and the vertebrate respiratory rhythms.

In a network driven by reciprocal inhibition, two (groups of) neurons reciprocally inhibit each other. Such networks are known as half-center oscillators. The neurons are not rhythmically active when isolated, but they can produce alternating patterns of activity when coupled by inhibitory connections. (The neurons can also produce activity patterns of other relative phasing, including synchrony, depending on the synaptic properties). The transitions between activated and inhibited states can occur via a number of mechanisms. For example, spike-frequency adaptation in the bursting neuron(s) may slowly release the other neuron(s) from inhibition. Reciprocal inhibition is a core feature of many CPGs, including those involved in locomotion.

Gap junctions also contribute to rhythmic oscillations and neuronal synchrony in CPGs. They act as low-pass filter allowing slow membrane voltage fluctuations to pass more effectively across cells. In neonatal mice, blocking gap junctions results in decreased rhythmic activity and can completely abolish drug induced fictive locomotion. In zebrafish, motor neurons retrogradely control swim frequency via gap junctions.

=== Short-term synaptic dynamics ===
CPG networks have extensive recurrent synaptic connections including reciprocal excitation and reciprocal inhibition. Synapses in CPG networks are subject to short-term activity dependent modifications. Short-term synaptic depression and facilitation of synapses can play a role in transitions between active and inactive phases of bursting and termination of bursts.

=== CPG circuits ===
CPG circuits thought to be involved in the control of locomotion consist of motor neurons and spinal interneurons and are located in the lower thoracic and lumbar regions of the vertebrate spinal cord, and in each neuromere of the invertebrate ventral nerve cord. CPG neurons involved in swallowing are located in the brain stem, specifically the hypoglossal nucleus within the medulla.

While the general location of CPG neurons can often be inferred, the specific location and identity of the participating neurons are only beginning to be understood. CPG networks are often distributed and can be flexibly reorganized, making it challenging to identify spinal interneurons. Over the past few decades, molecular and genetic programs that control neuronal patterning have been used to specifically target spinal interneurons in mice and zebrafish. Developing neural tube of embryonic mouse shows expression of distinct transcription factors in domains along the dorso-ventral axis of the spinal cord. These domains give rise to distinct population of neurons that have been classified as dorsal (dI1-dI6) and ventral (V0-V3) cardinal classes of spinal interneurons. The ventral neurons are considered to be members of the spinal CPG network. Each of these interneuron class can be further divided into diverse subpopulations of neurons with distinct neurotransmitter phenotype, axonal projection and function during locomotion. For example, V2 interneurons are ipsilaterally projecting that can be further classified as excitatory V2a and inhibitory V2b. V2s are important for flexor-extensor alternation and provide excitation to motor neurons.

== Neuromodulation ==
Organisms must adapt their behavior to meet the needs of their internal and external environments. Central pattern generators, as part of the neural circuitry of an organism, can be modulated to adapt to the organism's needs and surroundings. Three roles of neuromodulation have been found for CPG circuits:

1. Modulation is intrinsic to CPG network or required for its activation
2. Modulation changes the functional configuration of CPGs to produce different outputs
3. Modulation alters CPG neuron complement by switching neurons between networks and fusing formerly separate networks into larger entities

Neuromodulatory synapses may be part of the CPG network itself. For example, the CPG underlying the escape swim response in Tritonia diomedea contains intrinsic neuromodulatory neurons. These neuromodulatory neurons can enhance neurotransmitter release from another neuron in the circuit and its neuromodulatory actions are thought to be important for producing swim motor program. Neuromodulatory inputs can also activate CPG networks and can be necessary for generation of rhythmic output. Loss of neuromodulatory inputs can abolish rhythmic activity from pyloric network. In vertebrates, application of neuromodulators have been shown to evoke locomotor activity.

Neuromodulators can alter the synaptic strength as well as intrinsic properties of neurons. These actions can alter the frequency and the phase relationships between neurons and thereby change the output pattern of the circuit. For example, exogenous application of various neuromodulators can elicit triphasic motor pattern in the STG where each modulator results in generation of a different motor pattern. Neuromodulatory projections expressing a common modulator can also elicit different patterns from the same network. Stimulation of different proctolin-containing projection neurons in the STG results in a distinct motor pattern from the same network due to differences in cotransmitter complement of these projection neurons.

The effects of neuromodulators are distributed throughout the CPG network. Specially, dopamine was shown to affect cellular and synaptic properties of nearly all components of the crustacean pyloric network. Moreover, dopamine can have opposing effects on different components of the network. As such, the final output of the network reflects a combination of modulatory actions on individual components.

=== Modulation alters CPG neurons ===
Neuronal composition of CPGs can vary with the state of the system. Neuromodulators can activate or inhibit neurons of the CPGs and can even combine different networks into one. For example, in the lobster stomatogastric nervous system the neuropeptide, red pigment concentrating hormone, can strengthen synapses between two different networks to create a single, combined rhythm. Neuromodulators can also result in switching of neurons from one network to another.

== Sensory feedback ==
Although the theory of central pattern generation calls for basic rhythmicity and patterning to be centrally generated, CPGs can respond to sensory feedback to alter the patterning in behaviorally appropriate ways. Alteration of the pattern is difficult because feedback received during only one phase may require changed movement in the other parts of the patterned cycle to preserve certain coordination relationships. For example, walking with a pebble in the right shoe alters the entire gait, even though the stimulus is only present while standing on the right foot. Even during the time when the left foot is down and the sensory feedback is inactive, action is taken to prolong the right leg swing and extend the time on the left foot, leading to limping. This effect could be due to widespread and long-lasting effects of the sensory feedback on the CPG or due to short-term effects on a few neurons that in turn modulate nearby neurons and spread the feedback through the entire CPG in that way. Some degree of modulation is required to allow one CPG to assume multiple states in response to feedback.

Additionally, the effect of the sensory input varies depending on the phase of the pattern in which it occurs. For example, during walking, resistance to the top of the swinging foot (e.g., by a horizontal stick) causes the foot to be lifted higher to move over the stick. However, the same input to the standing foot cannot cause the foot to lift or the person would collapse. Thus, depending on the phase, the same sensory input can cause the foot to be lifted higher or held more firmly to the ground. "This change in motor response as a function of motor pattern phase is called reflex reversal, and has been observed in invertebrates (DiCaprio and Clarac, 1981) and vertebrates (Forssberg et al., 1977). How this process occurs is poorly understood, but again two possibilities exist. One is that sensory input is appropriately routed to different CPG neurons as a function of motor pattern phase. The other is that the input reaches the same neurons at all phases, but that, as a consequence of the way in which the network transforms the input, network response varies appropriately as a function of motor pattern phase."

A study by Gottschall and Nichols examined the hindlimb of a decerebrate cat during walking (a CPG controlled function) in response to changes in head pitch. This study describes the differences in gait and body position of cats walking uphill, downhill and on level surfaces. Proprioceptive (Golgi tendon organs and muscle spindles) and exteroreceptive (optic, vestibular and cutaneous) receptors work alone or in combination to adjust the CPG to sensory feedback. The study explored the effects of neck proprioceptors (giving information about the relative location of the head and body) and vestibular receptors (giving information about the orientation of the head relative to gravity). Decerebrate cats were made to walk on a level surface with their heads level, tilted up or tilted down. Comparing the decerebrate cats to normal cats showed similar EMG patterns during level walking and EMG patterns that reflected downhill walking with the head titled up and uphill walking with the head tilted down. This study proved that neck proprioceptors and vestibular receptors contribute sensory feedback that alters the gait of the animal. This information may be useful for treatment of gait disorders.

== Functions ==
Central pattern generators can serve many functions. CPGs can play roles in movement, breathing, rhythm generation and other oscillatory functions. Below are several key functions of CPGs.

=== Locomotion ===
As early as 1911, it was recognized, by the experiments of Thomas Graham Brown, that the basic pattern of stepping can be produced by the spinal cord without the need of descending commands from the cortex.

The first modern evidence of the central pattern generator was produced by isolating the locust nervous system and showing that it could produce a rhythmic output in isolation resembling that of the locust in flight. This was discovered by Wilson in 1961. Since that time, evidence has arisen for the presence of central pattern generators in vertebrate animals, starting with work on the cat in the 1960s by Elzbieta Jankowska in Gothenburg, who provided the first evidence for a spinal cord CPG. This section addresses the role of the central pattern generator in locomotion for the lamprey and humans.

The lamprey has been used as a model for vertebrate CPGs because, while its nervous system has a vertebrate organization, it shares many positive characteristics with invertebrates. When removed from the lamprey, the intact spinal cord can survive for days in vitro. It also has very few neurons and can be easily stimulated to produce a fictive swimming motion indicative of a central pattern generator. As early as 1983, Ayers, Carpenter, Currie and Kinch proposed that there was a CPG responsible for most undulating movements in the lamprey including swimming forward and backward, burrowing in the mud and crawling on a solid surface, that although not surprisingly did not match the activity in the intact animal, nevertheless provided the basic locomotor output. The different movements have been found to be altered by neuromodulators, including serotonin in a study by Harris-Warrick and Cohen in 1985 and tachykinin in a study by Parker et al. in 1998. The lamprey model of CPG for locomotion has been important to the study of CPGs. Although Sten Grillner claims that the locomotor network is characterised, a claim that has seemingly been uncritically accepted by the spinal cord locomotor network field, there are in fact many missing details and Grillner cannot provide the evidence he uses to support his claims (Parker 2006). However, this neural circuit model of the lamprey CPG, including three classes (one excitatory and two inhibitory) of neurons but omitting sub-cellular details, provides a system level understanding of the CPG-generated locomotion whose speed and direction (swimming forward, backward, or turning) are set by non-rhythmic external inputs (from the brainstem) to the circuit. A general scheme of the lamprey CPG is now being used in the creation of artificial CPGs. For example, Ijspeert and Kodjabachian used Ekeberg's model for the lamprey to create artificial CPGs and simulate swimming movements in a lamprey-like substrate using controllers based on a SGOCE encoding. Essentially, these are the first steps toward the use of CPGs to code for locomotion in robots. The vertebrate model of CPG has been also developed with both Hodgkin-Huxley formalism, its variants and control system approaches. For example, Yakovenko and colleagues have developed a simple mathematical model that describes basic principles proposed by T.G. Brown with integrate-to-threshold units organized with mutually inhibitory connections. This model is sufficient to describe complex properties of behavior, such as different regimes of the extensor- and flexor-dominant locomotion observed during electrical stimulation of the mesencephalic locomotor region (MLR), MLR-induced fictive locomotion.

The connections between the CPGs that control each limb manage interlimb coordination and hence the gaits in quadrupedal and possibly also bipedal animals. Left right coordination is mediated by commissural and fore-hind as well as diagonal coordination is mediated by long-projecting propiospinal interneurons. The balance of the left-right alternation (mediated genetically identified V0d and V0v neuron classes) to left-synchronization promoting commissural interneurons (potentially mediated V3 neurons) determines whether walk and trot (alternating gaits) or gallop and bound (synchronous gaits) are expressed. This balance changes with increasing speed, potentially because of modulation by supraspinal drive from the MLR and mediated by the reticular formation, and causes speed dependent gait transitions characteristic for quadrupedal animals. The walk to trot transition potentially occurs because of the stronger decrease of extension than flexion phase durations with increasing locomotor speed and could be mediated by descending diagonal inhibition through V0d long propriospinal neurons, which leads to progressively increasing overlap between the diagonal limbs up until diagonal synchronization (trot). Commissural and long propriospinal neurons are a likely target of supraspinal and somatosensory afferent inputs to adjust interlimb coordination and gait to different environmental and behavioral conditions.

Central pattern generators also contribute to locomotion in humans. In 1994, Calancie, et al. described the "first well-defined example of a central rhythm generator for stepping in the adult human." The subject was a 37-year-old male who suffered an injury to the cervical spinal cord 17 years prior. After initial total paralysis below the neck, the subject eventually regained some movement of the arms and fingers and limited movement in the lower limbs. He had not recovered sufficiently to support his own weight. After 17 years, the subject found that when lying supine and extending his hips, his lower extremities underwent step-like movements for as long as he remained lying down. "The movements (i) involved alternating flexion and extension of his hips, knees, and ankles; (ii) were smooth and rhythmic; (iii) were forceful enough that the subject soon became uncomfortable due to excessive muscle 'tightness' and an elevated body temperature; and (iv) could not be stopped by voluntary effort." After extensive study of the subject, the experimenters concluded that "these data represent the clearest evidence to date that such a [CPG] network does exist in man." Four years later, in 1998, Dimitrijevic, et al. showed that the human lumbar pattern generating networks can be activated by drive to large-diameter sensory afferents of the posterior roots. When tonic electrical stimulation is applied to these fibers in motor complete spinal cord injured individuals (i.e., individuals in whom the spinal cord is functionally isolated from the brain) rhythmic, locomotor-like movement of the lower limbs can be elicited. These measurements were performed in supine position, thus minimizing peripheral feedback. Subsequent studies showed that these lumbar locomotor centers can form a large variety of rhythmic movements by combining and distributing stereotypical patterns to the numerous lower limb muscles. A CPG-activating drug treatment called Spinalon, active centrally upon oral administration, has also been shown to partially reactivate spinal locomotor neurons in complete or motor-complete spinal cord-injured patients. Indeed, a double-blind, randomized, placebo-controlled study in forty-five volunteers with chronic AIS A/B injuries (between 3 months and 30 years post-trauma) lying in the supine position for safety reasons, revealed that Spinalon below maximum tolerated dose (MTD was 500/125/50 mg/kg L-DOPA/carbidopa/buspirone) was well tolerated. Preliminary evidence of efficacy was also found using videotape and electromyographic recordings since doses below MTD could acutely induce rhythmic locomotor-like leg movements in groups with Spinalon, but not in those with placebo (cornstarch).

==== Control of locomotion ====
If step cycle durations and muscle activations were fixed, it would not be possible to change body velocity and adapt to varying terrain. It has been suggested that the mammalian locomotor CPG comprises a "timer" (possibly in the form of coupled oscillators) which generates step cycles of varying durations, and a "pattern formation layer," which selects and grades the activation of motor pools. Increasing the neural drive from the midbrain locomotor region (MLR) to the spinal CPG increases the step cycle frequency (the cadence). Swing and stance phase durations co-vary in a fairly fixed relationship, with stance phases changing more than swing phases.

Sensory input from the limbs may truncate or extend individual phase durations in a process akin to finite state control (in which "if-then" rules determine when state transitions occur). For example, if a limb that is swinging forward reaches the end of swing in less time than the current CPG-generated flexor phase duration, sensory input would cause the CPG timer to terminate swing and start the stance phase. Furthermore, as body velocity increases, the pattern formation layer would increase muscle activation nonlinearly to provide increased load-bearing and thrust forces. It has been posited that in well-predicted movements, CPG-generated phase durations and muscle forces closely match those required by the evolving biomechanical events, minimizing the sensory corrections required. The term "neuromechanical tuning" has been coined to describe this process.

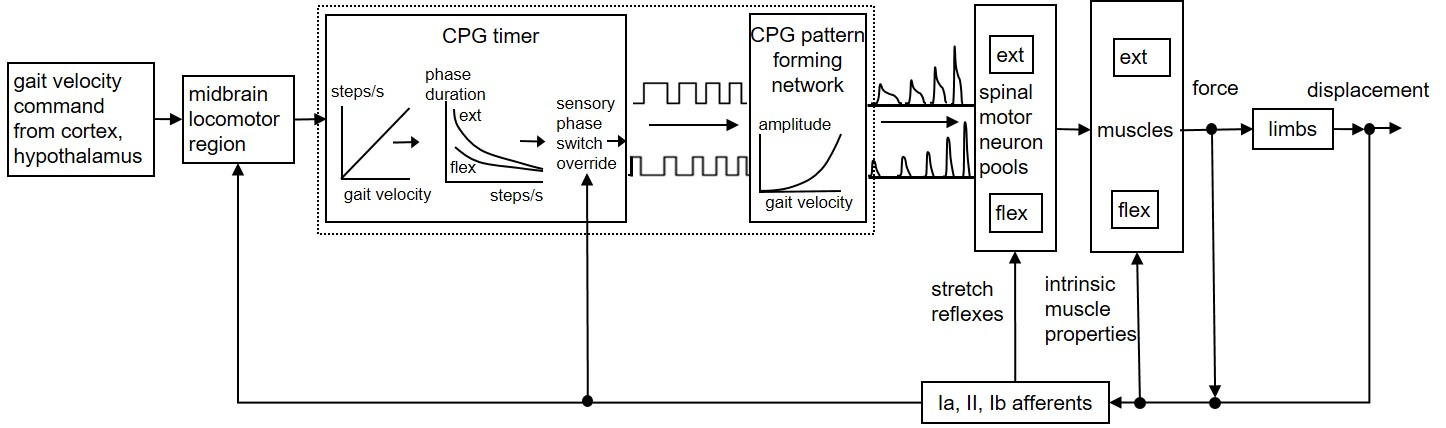
Fig. 1. Schematic of the locomotor central pattern generator in the mammalian nervous system. A command signal specifying increasing body velocity descends from deep brain nuclei via the MLR to the spinal cord and drives the timing element of the spinal locomotor CPG to generate cycles of increasing cadence. Extensor phase durations change more than flexor phase durations. The command signal also drives the pattern formation layer to generate cyclical activation of flexor and extensor motoneurons. Loading of the activated muscles (e.g. supporting the moving body mass) is resisted by the muscles' intrinsic spring-like properties. This is equivalent to displacement feedback. Force and displacement sensed by muscle spindle and Golgi tendon organ afferents reflexly activate motoneurons. A key role of these afferents is to adjust the timing of phase transitions, presumably by influencing or overriding the CPG timer. Modified from

Fig. 1 provides a simplified schematic that summarizes these proposed mechanisms. A command specifying desired body velocity descends from higher centers to the MLR, which drives the spinal locomotor CPG. The CPG timer produces the appropriate cadence and phase durations and the pattern formation layer modulates the motoneuronal outputs. The activated muscles resist stretch through their own intrinsic biomechanical properties, providing a rapid form of length and velocity feedback control. Reflexes mediated by Golgi tendon organ and other afferents provide additional load compensation, but the main role of sensory input may be to adjust or override the CPG at stance-swing-stance transitions.

As described in Neuromodulation, the human locomotive CPG is very adaptable and can respond to sensory input. It receives input from the brainstem as well as from the environment to keep the network regulated. Newer studies have not only confirmed the presence of the CPG for human locomotion, but also confirmed its robustness and adaptability. For example, Choi and Bastian showed that the networks responsible for human walking are adaptable on short and long timescales. They showed adaptation to different gait patterns and different walking contexts. Also, they showed that different motor patterns can adapt independently. Adults could even walk on treadmills going in a different direction for each leg. This study showed that independent networks control forward and backward walking and that networks controlling each leg can adapt independently and be trained to walk independently. Thus, humans also possess a central pattern generator for locomotion that is capable not only of rhythmic pattern generation but also remarkable adaptation and usefulness in a wide variety of situations.

=== Respiration ===
A three-phase model is the classical view of the respiratory CPG. The phases of the respiratory CPG are characterized by the rhythmic activity of: (1) the phrenic nerve during inspiration; (2) recurrent laryngeal nerve branches that innervate the thyroarytenoid muscle during the last stage of expiration; (3) the internal intercostal nerve branches that innervate the triangularis sterni muscle during the second stage of expiration. The rhythmicity of these nerves is classically viewed as originating from a single rhythm generator. In this model, phasing is produced by reciprocal synaptic inhibition between groups of sequentially active interneurons.

Nevertheless, an alternative model has been proposed reinforced by certain experimental data. According to this model, respiratory rhythm is generated by two coupled anatomically distinct rhythm generators, one in the pre-Boetzinger complex and the other in the retrotrapezoid nucleus / parafacial respiratory group. Further survey provided evidence to the hypothesis that one of the networks is responsible for inspiration rhythm and the other for expiration rhythm. Therefore, inspiration and expiration are distinct functions and one does not induce the other, as is the common belief, but one of two dominates the behavior by generating a faster rhythm.

=== Swallowing ===
Swallowing involves the coordinated contraction of more than 25 pairs of muscles in the oropharynx, larynx and esophagus, which are active during an oropharyngeal phase, followed by the primary esophageal peristalsis. Swallowing depends on a deglutition centre, a CPG located in the medulla oblongata, which involves several brain stem motor nuclei and two main groups of interneurons: a dorsal swallowing group (DSG) in the nucleus tractus solitarii and a ventral swallowing group (VSG) located in the ventrolateral medulla above the nucleus ambiguus. Neurons in the DSG are responsible for the generation of the swallowing pattern, while those in the VSG distribute the commands to the various motoneuronal pools. As in other CPGs, the functioning of the central network can be modulated by peripheral and central inputs, so that the swallowing pattern is adapted to the size of the bolus.

Within this network, central inhibitory connections play a major role, producing a rostrocaudal inhibition that parallels the rostrocaudal anatomy of the swallowing tract. Thus, when the neurons controlling the proximal parts of the tract are active, those that command more distal parts are inhibited. Apart from the type of connection between the neurons, intrinsic properties of the neurons, especially those of NTS neurons, probably also contribute to the shaping and timing of the swallowing pattern.

The swallowing CPG is a flexible CPG. This means that at least some of the swallowing neurons may be multifunctional neurons and belong to pools of neurons that are common to several CPGs. One such CPG is the respiratory one, which has been observed interacting with the swallowing CPG.

=== Rhythm generators ===
Central pattern generators can also play a role in rhythm generation for other functions in vertebrates. For example, the rat vibrissa system uses an unconventional CPG for whisking movements. "Like other CPGs, the whisking generator can operate without cortical input or sensory feedback. However, unlike other CPGs, vibrissa motoneurons actively participate in rhythmogenesis by converting tonic serotonergic inputs into the patterned motor output responsible for movement of the vibrissae." Breathing is another non-locomotive function of central pattern generators. For example, larval amphibians accomplish gas exchange largely through rhythmic ventilation of the gills. A study showed that lung ventilation in the tadpole brainstem may be driven by a pacemaker-like mechanism, whereas the respiratory CPG adapts in the adult bullfrog as it matures. Thus, CPGs hold a broad range of functions in the vertebrate animal and are widely adaptable and variable with age, environment and behavior.

=== Mechanism ===
Rhythmicity in CPGs can also result from time-dependent cellular properties such as adaptation, delayed excitation, and post-inhibitory rebound (PIR). PIR is an intrinsic property that elicits rhythmic electrical activity by depolarizing the membrane once hyperpolarizing stimulus is gone. It can be produced by several mechanisms including hyperpolarization-activated cation current (Ih), low-voltage activated calcium current, or deinactivation of depolarization-activated inward currents. Once inhibition has ceased, this period of PIR can be explained as the time with increased neuronal excitability. It is the property of many CNS neurons that sometimes results in action potential "bursts" following immediately after inhibitory synaptic input. "Because of this, it has been suggested that PIR may contribute to the maintenance of oscillatory activity in neural networks that are characterized by mutual inhibitory connections, like those involved in locomotor behaviors. In addition, PIR is often included as an element in computational models of neural networks that involve mutual inhibition". For example, the "PIR in crayfish stretch receptor neurons is caused by recovery from adaptation during the course of inhibitory hyperpolarization. One feature of that system is that PIR only occurs if the hyperpolarization is imposed on a background of excitation, caused in this case by stretch. They also found that PIR can be elicited in the stretch receptor by hyperpolarizing current pulses. This was an important finding because it showed that PIR is an intrinsic property of the postsynaptic neuron, related to the membrane potential change associated with inhibition but independent of transmitter receptors or presynaptic properties. The latter conclusion has stood the test of time, marking PIR as a robust property of CNS neurons in a wide variety of contexts." This cellular property can most easily be seen in the Lamprey neural circuit. The swimming movement is produced by alternating neural activity between the left and right side of the body, causing it to bend back and forth while creating oscillating movements. While the Lamprey is bent to the left, there is reciprocal inhibition on the right side causing it to relax due to hyperpolarization. Immediately after this hyperopolarizing stimulus, the interneurons use post-inhibitory rebound to initiate activity in the right side. Depolarization of the membrane causes it to contract while reciprocal inhibition is now applied to the left side.

=== Functions in invertebrates ===
CPGs play a similarly critical role in coordinating behaviors in invertebrates, and studying invertebrate CPGs with fewer numbers of neurons has helped establish general principles of CPGs and their organization in the nervous system. One model circuit for studying CPGs is the stomatogastric ganglion in crabs and lobsters, a ~30 neuron circuit containing two CPGs that generate rhythmic motor output for chewing and digesting food. Dissection of these circuits has revealed neural mechanisms of CPGs. For example, the pyloric CPG - which controls the contraction and dilation of the pylorus - contains a set of conditional oscillatory neurons and one pacemaker neuron that fires rhythmically when dissected out of the circuit. Coordinated rhythmic behaviors like walking, flight and grooming are also controlled by CPGs in some invertebrates. Continued research into how CPGs control these behaviors has revealed a nested CPG architecture to control rhythmic behaviors across various timescales. Other examples of CPGs in invertebrate animals include a CPG modulating reflexive withdrawal, escape swimming and crawling in the mollusc Tritonia, and to control the heartbeat of leeches. Central pattern generators play a broad role in all animals and show amazing variability and adaptability in almost all cases.

== Alternative interpretations ==
One theory that reconciles the role of sensory feedback during rhythmic locomotion is to redefine CPGs as "state estimators" as opposed to rhythm generators. Through this perspective, CPGs are an intrinsic spinal processor that corrects imperfect sensory feedback and adapts central input to this optimized peripheral input. Models using this framework are able to accomplish rhythmic behavior as well as fictive locomotion without incorporating independent rhythm generators.
