= Corticobulbar tract =

Two-neuron white matter motor pathway

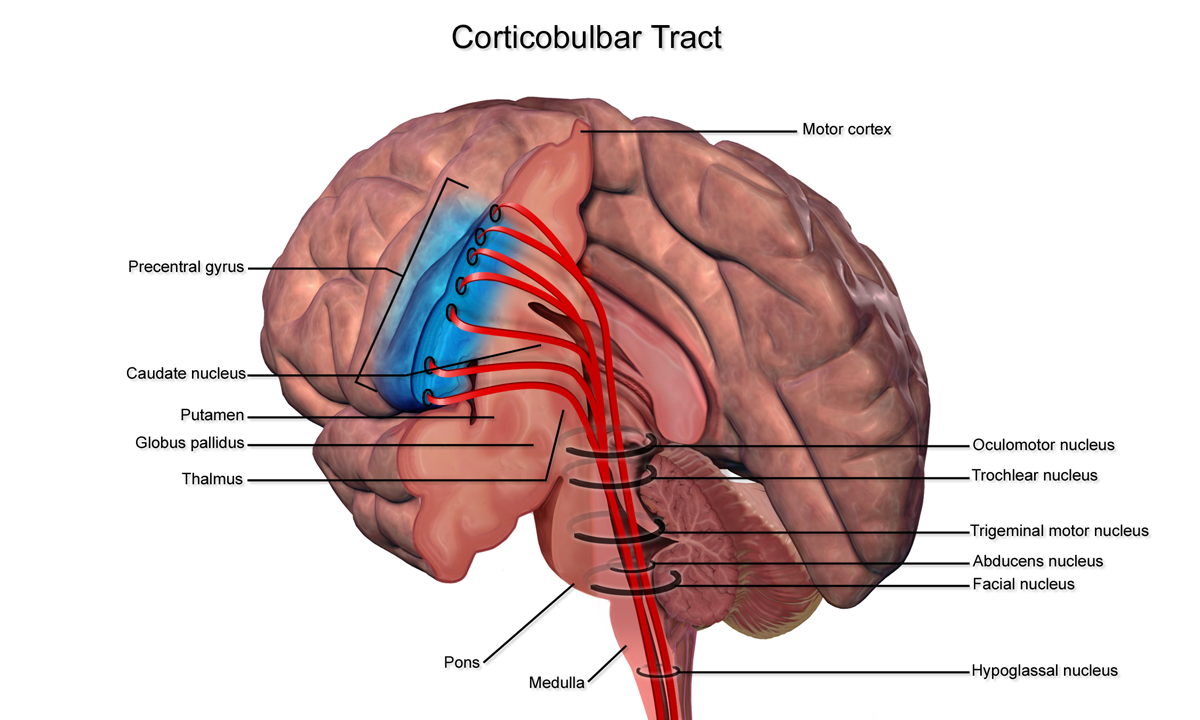
- Corticobulbar tract.

- Components and location of the corticobulbar tract.

Details

Identifiers
- Latin: tractus corticonuclearis, tractus corticobulbaris
- NeuroNames: 1319

The corticobulbar (or corticonuclear) tract is a two-neuron white matter motor pathway connecting the motor cortex in the cerebral cortex to the medullary pyramids, which are part of the brainstem's medulla oblongata (also called "bulbar") region, and are primarily involved in carrying the motor function of the non-oculomotor cranial nerves, like muscles of the face, head and neck. The corticobulbar tract is one of the pyramidal tracts, the other being the corticospinal tract.

== Structure ==
The corticobulbar tract originates in the primary motor cortex of the frontal lobe, just superior to the lateral fissure and rostral to the central sulcus in the precentral gyrus (Brodmann area 4). The corticobulbar tract however also includes fibres from disparate regions from across the cerebral cortex (not limited to the frontal lobes).

The tract descends through the corona radiata and then the genu of the internal capsule (with a few fibers in the posterior limb of the internal capsule) to the midbrain. In the midbrain, the internal capsule becomes the cerebral peduncles. The white matter is located in the ventral portion of the cerebral peduncles, called the crus cerebri. The middle third of the crus cerebri contains the corticobulbar and corticospinal fibers. The corticobulbar fibers exit at the appropriate level of the brainstem to synapse on the lower motor neurons of the cranial nerves. In addition to endings in these motor neurons, fibers of the corticobulbar tract also end in the sensory nuclei of the brainstem including gracile nucleus, cuneate nucleus, solitary nucleus, and all trigeminal nuclei.

Only 50% of the corticobulbar fibers decussate, in contrast to those of the corticospinal tract where most decussate: cranial nerve nuclei innervating skeletal muscle thereby generally receive bilateral first-order neuron innervation (i.e. from both hemispheres).

== Functions ==
The corticobulbar tract is composed of the upper motor neurons of the cranial nerves. The muscles of the face, head and neck are controlled by the corticobulbar system, which terminates on motor neurons within brainstem motor nuclei. This is in contrast to the corticospinal tract in which the cerebral cortex connects to spinal motor neurons, and thereby controls movement of the torso, upper and lower limbs. Fibers that end in the sensory nuclei of the brainstem are thought to enhance or inhibit sensory transmission across various sensory nuclei. This allows for the selective attention or inattention towards various stimuli.

The corticobulbar tract innervates cranial motor nuclei bilaterally with the exception of the lower facial nuclei (which innervates facial muscles below the eyes) and the genioglossus muscle, which are innervated only unilaterally by the contralateral cortex. Among those nuclei that are bilaterally innervated a slightly stronger connection contralaterally than ipsilaterally is observed. The corticobulbar tract directly innervates the nuclei for cranial nerves V, VII, IX, and XII. The corticobulbar tract also contributes to the motor regions of cranial nerve X in the nucleus ambiguus.

== See also ==
- Upper motor neuron lesion
