= Corticospinal tract =

Pyramidal white matter motor pathway

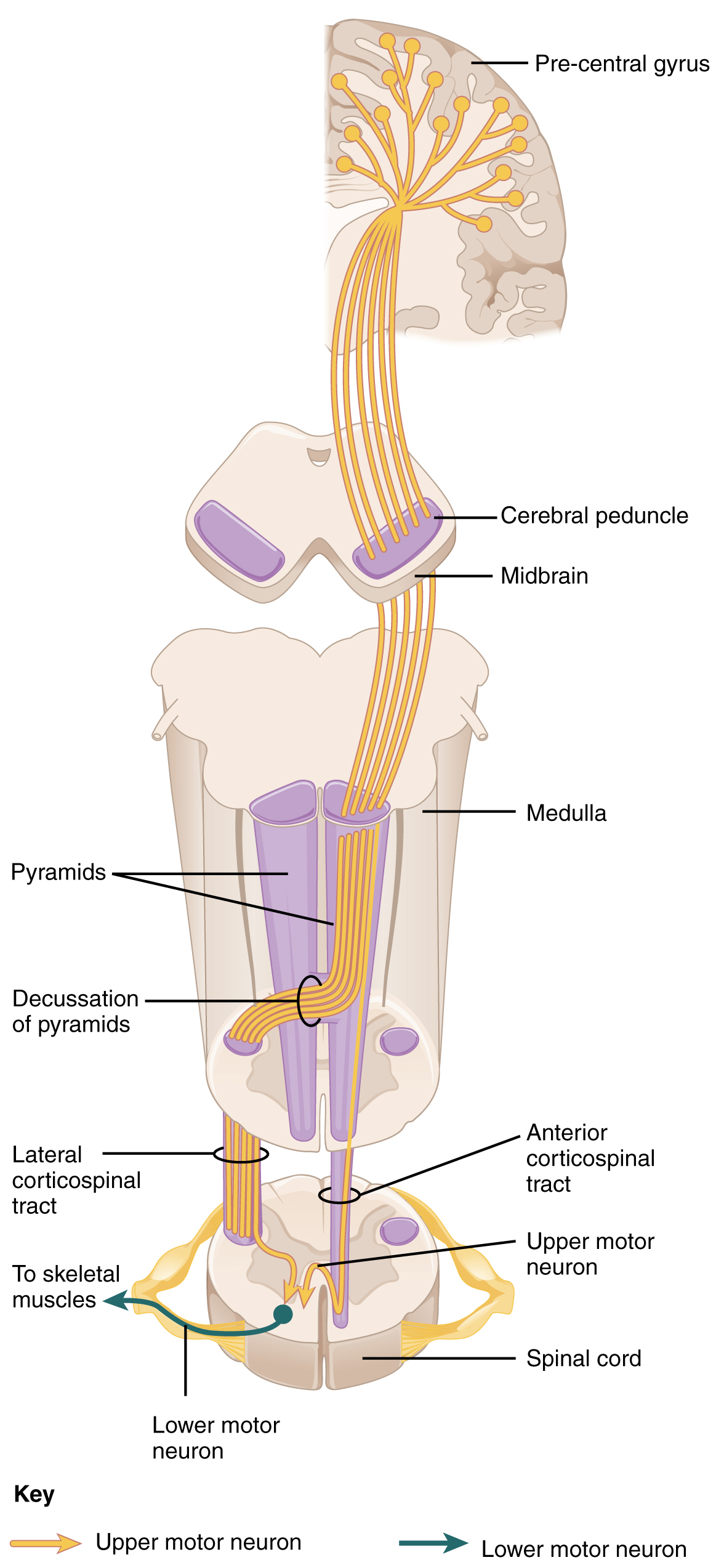
- Corticospinal pathway

Details

Identifiers
- Latin: tractus corticospinalis
- FMA: 265580

The corticospinal tract is a white matter motor pathway starting at the cerebral cortex that terminates on lower motor neurons and interneurons in the spinal cord, controlling movements of the limbs and trunk. There are more than one million neurons in the corticospinal tract, and they become myelinated usually in the first two years of life.

The corticospinal tract is one of the pyramidal tracts, the other being the corticobulbar tract.

== Anatomy ==
The corticospinal tract originates in several parts of the brain, including not just the motor areas, but also the primary somatosensory cortex and premotor areas. Most of the neurons originate in either the primary motor cortex (precentral gyrus, Brodmann area 4) or the premotor frontal areas. About 30% of corticospinal neurons originate in the primary motor cortex, 30% more in the premotor cortex and supplementary motor areas, with the remaining 40% distributed between the somatosensory cortex, the parietal lobe, and cingulate gyrus. These upper motor neurons originate in layer V pyramidal cells of the neocortex, and travel through the posterior limb of the internal capsule in the forebrain, to enter the cerebral crus at the base of the midbrain. Then both tracts pass through the brain stem, from the pons and then to the medulla. The corticospinal tract, along with the corticobulbar tract, form two pyramids on either side of the medulla of the brainstem—and give their name as pyramidal tracts. Corticospinal neurons synapse directly onto alpha motor neurons for direct muscle control.

Betz cells are very large cells that are very visible under a microscope, and while they account for only about 5% of cells projecting to the spinal cord, they are often considered most crucial for communication of motor signals. These cells are notable because of their rapid conduction rate, over 70m/sec, the fastest conduction of any signals from the brain to the spinal cord.

There are two divisions of the corticospinal tract, the lateral corticospinal tract and the anterior corticospinal tract. The lateral corticospinal tract neurons cross the midline at the level of the medulla oblongata, and controls the limbs and digits. The lateral tract forms about 90% of connections in the corticospinal tract; the vast majority cross over in the medulla, while the rest (about 2-3%) remain ipsilateral. The anterior corticospinal tract neurons, the remaining 10%, stay ipsilateral in the spinal cord but decussate at the level of the spinal nerve in which they exit, and control the trunk, shoulder and neck muscles.

== Function ==
The primary purpose of the corticospinal tract is for voluntary motor control of the body and limbs.

However, connections to the somatosensory cortex suggest that the pyramidal tracts are also responsible for modulating sensory information from the body.

Because most (75-80%) of the connections cross the midline at the level of the medulla and others at the level of the spinal cord, each side of the brain is responsible for controlling muscles on the opposite side of the body.

After patients are lesioned in some part of the pyramidal tracts, they are paralyzed on the corresponding side of the body. However, they can re-learn some crude, basic motions, just no fine movements.

This implies that the connections to these tracts are crucial for fine movement, and only partial recovery is possible if they are damaged.
