= Midbrain reticular formation =

Details

Identifiers
- Latin: formatio reticularis mesencephali
- MeSH: D066265
- NeuroLex ID: birnlex_1235

The midbrain reticular formation (MRF), also known as reticular formation of midbrain, mesencephalic reticular formation, tegmental reticular formation, and formatio reticularis (tegmenti) mesencephali, is the part of the reticular formation in the midbrain. It consists of the dorsal tegmental nucleus, ventral tegmental nucleus, and cuneiform nucleus. These are also known as the tegmental nuclei.

The dorsal and ventral tegmental nuclei receive connections from the mammillo-tegmental bundle of Gudden, a branch of the mammillothalamic tract. The bundle of Gudden might be identical to the hypothalamotegmental tract.

Along with the oral pontine reticular nucleus, the midbrain reticular formation projects to the gigantocellular reticular nucleus.

The midbrain reticular formation is the point at which the different algedonic signals come together, ensuring that the organism is aware of potential threats.

== See also ==
- Hypothalamotegmental tract
- Mammillothalamic tract
- Mesencephalic locomotor region
