= Juxtarestiform body =

Subdivision of the inferior cerebellar peduncle

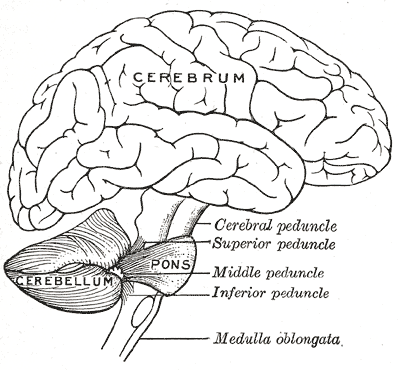
- Scheme showing the connections of the several parts of the brain. (Inferior peduncle labeled at bottom right.)

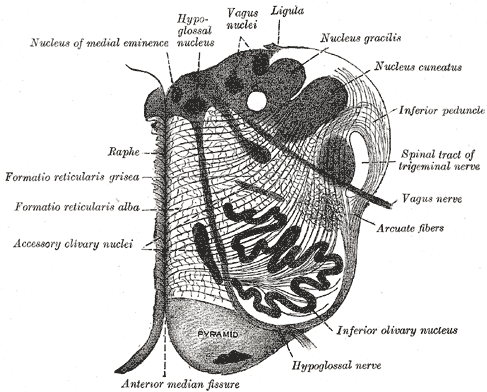
- Section of the medulla oblongata at about the middle of the olive. (Inferior peduncle labeled at upper right.

Details

Identifiers
- Latin: Corpus juxtarestiforme
- NeuroNames: 779
- NeuroLex ID: birnlex_1101
- TA98: A14.1.04.119; A14.1.07.415
- TA2: 5854
- FMA: 72613

The juxtarestiform body is the smaller, medial subdivision of each inferior cerebellar peduncle (the other, lateral one being the restiform body).

The juxtarestiform body contains mostly cerebellar afferents, but also some cerebellar efferents.

== Anatomy ==
=== Afferents ===
- Vestibulocerebellar fibers: include second-order fibers from the vestibular nuclei (project bilaterally) as well as a few first-order fibers from the vestibular ganglion/nerve (project ipsilaterally). The fibers project to the vestibulocerebellum and cerebellar vermis (of the spinocerebellum) as well as to (ipsilateral and contralateral) fastigial and dentate nuclei.

=== Efferents ===
- Cerebellovestibular fibers: arise from Purkinje cells of the flocculonodular lobe of the cerebellum.
  - Fastigiovestibular fibers: mainly project to both ipsilateral and contralateral lateral and inferior vestibular nuclei to influence both vestibulospinal tracts.
  - Fastigiobulbar fibers: project bilaterally to the (medullary and pontine) reticular formation to influence both reticulospinal tracts (but mostly the contralateral one).
- Cerebelloreticular fibers

== Function ==
The juxtarestiform body coordinates balance and eye movements by communication between the vestibular apparatus and the cerebellum.

== Additional images ==
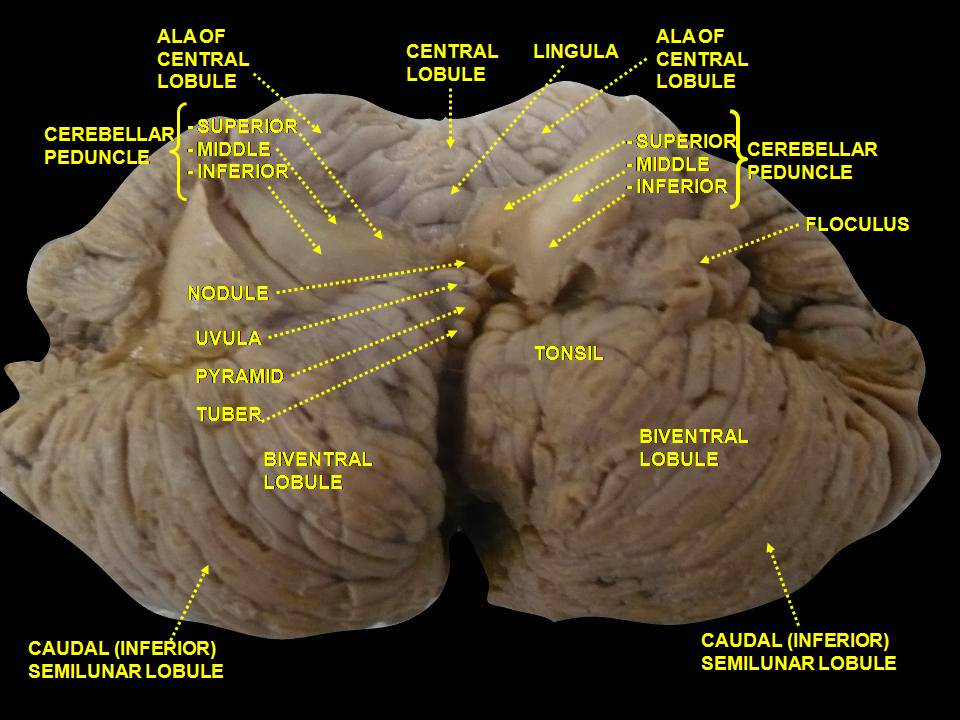
Cerebellum:—Inferior surface showing inferior cerebellar peduncle

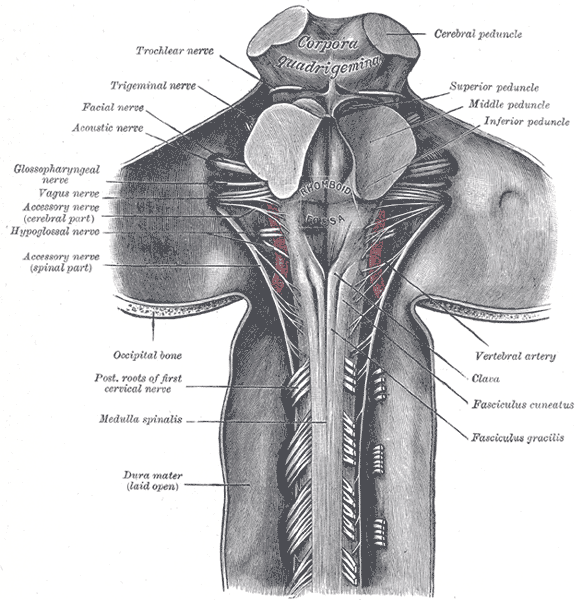
Upper part of medulla spinalis and hind- and mid-brains; posterior aspect, exposed in situ.
