= Flocculonodular lobe =

Lobe of the cerebellum

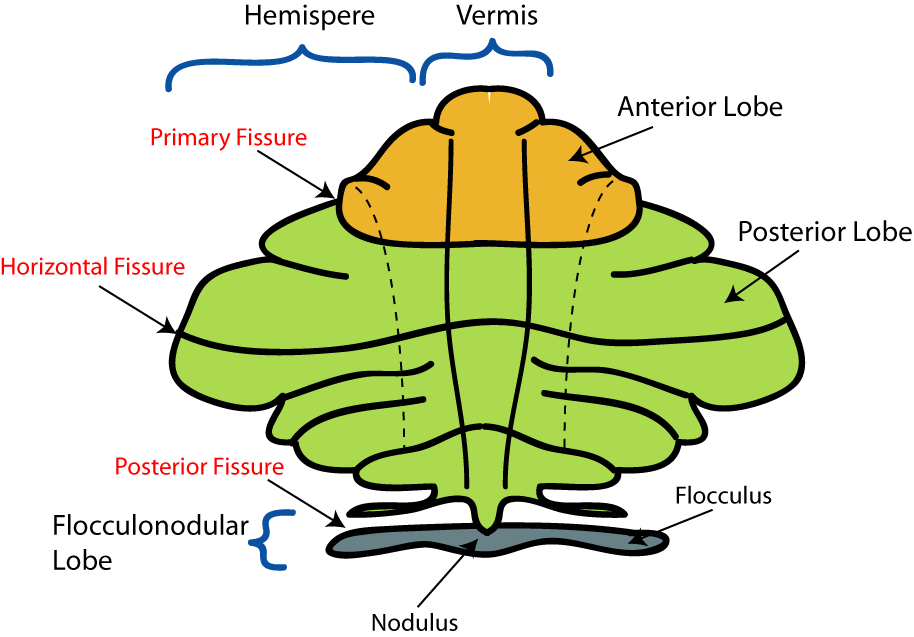
- Schematic representation of the major anatomical subdivisions of the cerebellum. Superior view of an "unrolled" cerebellum, placing the vermis in one plane.

- Basal view of a human brain

Identifiers
- NeuroNames: 679
- NeuroLex ID: birnlex_904
- TA98: A14.1.07.301
- TA2: 5799
- FMA: 72253

The flocculonodular lobe (vestibulocerebellum) is one of the lobes of the cerebellum. It is a small lobe consisting of the unpaired midline nodule and the two flocculi: one flocculus on either side of the nodule. The lobe is involved in maintaining posture and balance as well as coordinating head-eye movements.

The lobe is functionally associated with the vestibular system and is therefore also referred to as the vestibulocerebellum. It receives second-order fiber afferents from the vestibular nuclei as well as direct first-order afferents from the vestibular ganglion/nerve (the only region of the cerebellum to do so).

The lobe in turn projects efferents back to the vestibular nuclei which in turn give rise or project to: the lateral vestibulospinal tracts which maintain posture and balance by regulating tone of the axial and proximal limb extensor muscles (i.e. the antigravity muscles); the medial vestibulospinal tracts which regulate the tone of neck muscles; and the medial longitudinal fasciculi which coordinates head-eye movements (vestibuloocular reflex).

== Anatomy ==
=== Afferents ===
Afferents of the lobe are the vestibulocerebellar fibers arising from either the vestibular nuclei or the vestibular nerve/ganglion directly.

- Vestibular organs → vestibular nerve/vestibular ganglion first-order fibers (→ vestibular nuclei (synapse) → second-order fibers) → juxtarestiform body of inferior cerebellar peduncle → (ipsilateral) flocculonodular lobe of cerebellum (synapse/termination of vestibulocerebellar fibers)

=== Efferents ===
Efferents of the lobe are the cerebellovestibular fibers which project to the vestibular nuclei.

- Purkinje cells of flocculonodular lobe → juxtarestiform body of inferior cerebellar peduncle → vestibular nuclei (synapse/termination of cerebellovestibular fibers) →
  - Medial and lateral vestibulospinal tracts (extrapyramidal upper motor neurons) → (synapse) lower motor neurons → skeletal muscle
  - Medial longitudinal fasciculi → nuclei of cranial nerves III/IV/VI (synapse) → cranial nerves III/IV/VI → extrinsic eye muscles

== Clinical significance ==
Lesions to this area can result in multiple deficits in visual tracking and oculomotor control (such as nystagmus and vertigo), integration of vestibular information for eye and head control, as well as control of axial muscles for balance.

The most common cause of damage to the flocculonodular lobe is medulloblastoma in childhood.
