= Papez circuit =

Neural circuit

- The structures of the Papez circuit in the brain form a curved shape around the brainstem

The Papez circuit /peɪpz/, or medial limbic circuit, is a neural circuit for the control of emotional expression. In 1937, James Papez proposed that the circuit connecting the hypothalamus to the limbic lobe was the basis for emotional experiences. Paul D. MacLean reconceptualized Papez's proposal and coined the term limbic system. MacLean redefined the circuit as the "visceral brain" which consisted of the limbic lobe and its major connections in the forebrain – hypothalamus, amygdala, and septum. Over time, the concept of a forebrain circuit for the control of emotional expression has been modified to include the prefrontal cortex.

== Structure ==
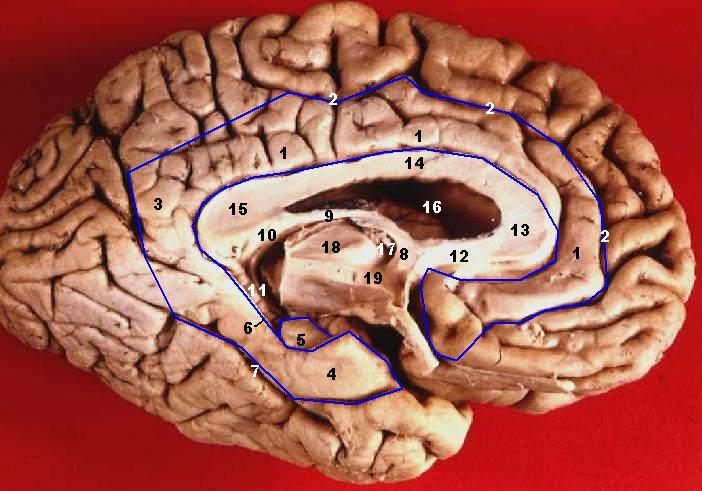
In a dissected brain, the inferior medial view shows the curved shape of the structures of the Papez circuit in the human brain.

The Papez circuit involves various structures of the brain. It begins and ends with the hippocampus (or the hippocampal formation). Fiber dissection indicates that the average size of the circuit is 350 millimeters. The Papez circuit goes through the following neural pathways:

Hippocampal formation (subiculum) → fornix → mammillary bodies → mammillothalamic tract → anterior thalamic nucleus → cingulum → entorhinal cortex → hippocampal formation.

A photograph of the inferior medial view of the brain when dissected clearly shows the layout of the Papez circuit. Due to the location of the structures in the circuit, the resulting shape is a limbus. This is what drove MacLean to call the circuit the limbic system when he later modified the circuit.

Various studies indicate that the Papez circuit is greatly influenced by the cerebellum and that perhaps the hippocampus is not the starting point of the circuit. Anatomically, this would make sense since the cerebellum is connected to the circuit with many fine fibers and fiber bundles. Chemical lesions on the cerebellum seem to have an inhibitory effect on the circuit. Animal behavioral studies show that electrical stimulation of the anterior cerebellum can cause arousal, predatory attack, and feeding responses, all of which are thought to be expressions of emotion. Overall, these studies provide evidence that the cerebellum may also be included in an emotional system of the brain.

In recent years, multiple additional limbic fiber connectivity has been revealed using Diffusion MRI-weighted imaging MRI techniques. The equivalent fiber connectivity of all these pathways has been documented by dissection studies in primates. The fiber tracts include the amygdalofugal tract, amygdalothalamic tract, stria terminalis, dorsal thalamo-hypothalamic tract, cerebellohypothalamic tracts, and the parieto-occipito-hypothalamic tract.

== Function ==
=== Emotion ===
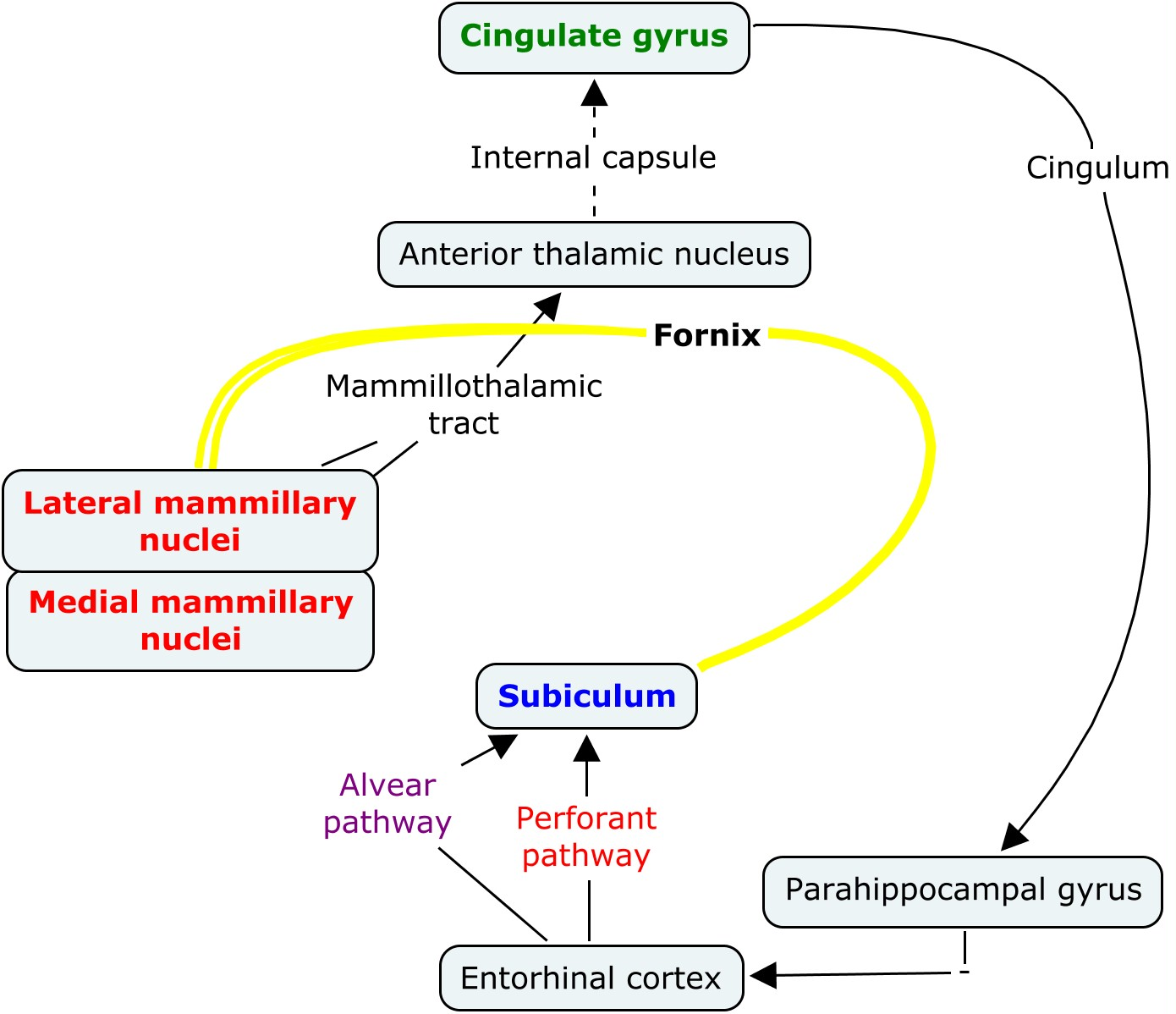
A heuristic model of the neural pathway of the Papez circuit shows the connections between its different parts.

Based on Papez's experiment with aggression in rats and other studies, it was initially believed that the circuit was involved with emotion. The circuit connects the hypothalamus and the cortex and acts as the emotional system of the brain. "The cingulate cortex projects to the hippocampus, and the hippocampus projects to the hypothalamus by way of the bundle of axons called the fornix. Hypothalamic effects reach the cortex via a relay in the anterior thalamic nuclei."

However, there has not been additional proof of the circuit's role in emotion over the years. Now, the Amygdala is thought to play a key role in emotion, a structure that was not a part of the Papez circuit until 1952 when MacLean included it in the modified version of the circuit, the limbic system.

=== Memory ===
In the past few years, many experiments have been done that involve structures of the Papez circuit. Moreover, many cases where structures of the Papez circuit have been damaged show changes that indicate its real function.

Theta waves are used to measure activity in mainly the hippocampus but can be used to measure other brain regions as well. Strong synchronization of theta waves in the hippocampus and anterior ventral thalamus has been observed. Although theta waves between the hippocampus and the anterior dorsal and anterior medial regions in the thalamus showed no synchronization, scientists have seen a marked increase in firing rates of the neurons in the brain regions. Overall, based on theta wave experimentation, some components of the Papez circuit have shown to indeed have a connection and work together. Also, theta waves are thought to be linked to learning and memory. Consequently, many scientists believe that the Papez circuit is involved with memory because of theta wave experiments. Some scientists have narrowed it down to specifically spatial and episodic memory.

Damage to the mammillothalamic tract, ventral anterior nucleus, and ventral lateral nucleus can result in memory and language impairment. Amnesia can be a result of disconnection of the mammillary bodies from the Papez circuit.

The fornix is a bundle of nerve tracts made of white matter. It is crucial in normal cognitive functions. Harm to the fornix can result in amnesia.

== Clinical significance ==
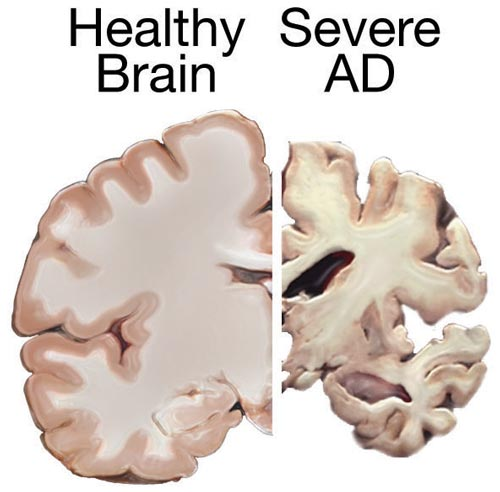
Compared to a healthy individual, Alzheimer's patients experience significantly more brain loss. The neurodegenerative effects of the disease can be seen by comparing the brains of a healthy individual and an Alzheimer's patient.

=== Alzheimer's disease ===
Alzheimer's disease is a common neurodegenerative disease and a form of dementia. It leaves patients impaired or unable to learn new information. They usually have difficulty coming up with the names of people, objects, etc. Degeneration or other neural problems because of this disease commonly occurs in parts of the Papez circuit. It is already known that problems with episodic memory are linked to tumors or damage in the Papez circuit. Specific structures of the Papez circuit linked to episodic memory are the hippocampus and other medial temporal lobe structures. As a result of these adverse effects on episodic memory, damage to the Papez circuit can not only indicate or predict amnesia but also Alzheimer's in a patient.

=== Parkinson's disease ===
Parkinson's disease is caused by the degeneration of the substantia nigra in the midbrain. There may also be damage to the structures of the Papez circuit in this disease. Usually, Parkinson's is correlated with depletion of dopamine in the basal ganglia.

=== Semantic dementia ===
Semantic dementia is a rare degenerative disorder that exhibits defects in all semantic memory functions, including naming, single word comprehension and impoverished general knowledge, with relative preservation of other components of speech, perceptual and nonverbal problem-solving skills, and episodic memory. This may occur due to damage in the mammillary bodies, ventral anterior nucleus, and ventral lateral nucleus which has resulted in disruption in language in previous research.

=== Alcoholic Korsakoff syndrome ===
Alcoholic Korsakoff syndrome occurs when a chronic alcoholic patient suffers from poor nutrition and specifically develops a thiamine deficiency. Usually with this disease, there are widespread abnormalities in the Papez and fronto-cerebellar circuits. The mammillary bodies are an important part of the Papez circuit. If there is damage, such as loss of neurons and/or myelination, to the mammillary bodies, the Papez circuit can be severely affected. There will be a disruption in the connecting parts of the system. As a result, the ability to learn new information or to retrieve recently acquired memories is significantly reduced or lost.

=== Transient global amnesia ===
Transient global amnesia is a very rare disorder and not much is known about it. Patients acutely develop a selective disorder of episodic memory, losing from several to 48 hours of previously learned information and are unable to learn new information. Damage to the hippocampus and other medial lobe structures in the Papez circuit is thought to be the cause of reduced or lost episodic memory.

== History ==
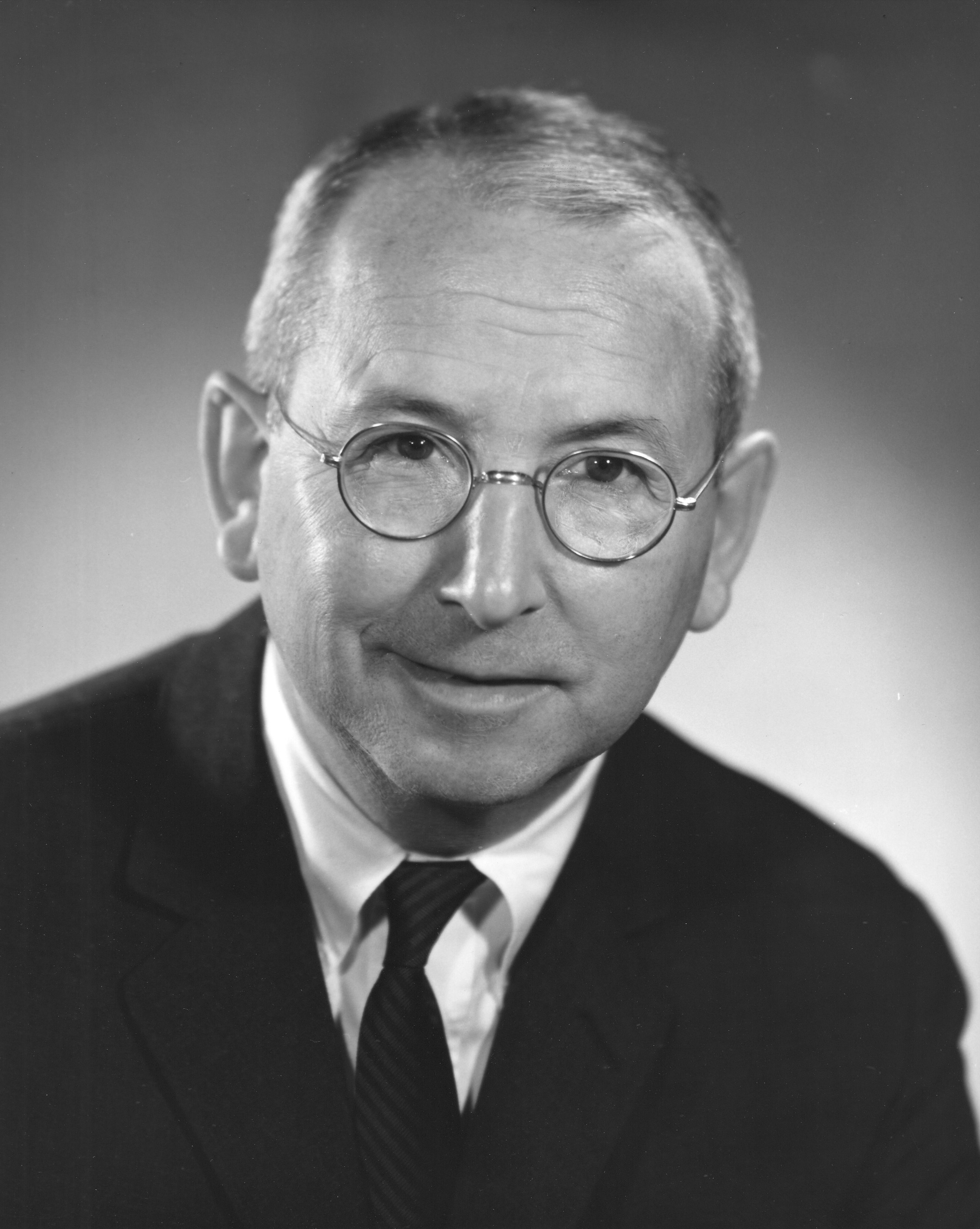
Neuroscientist Paul D. MacLean is famous for his work on the limbic system and its evolutionary history.

In 1907/1908, Bavarian neuropathologist Christfried Jakob discovered the visceral brain. By date, he held the "... first interpretation of the limbic or ‘internal’ brain as a viscero-emotional mechanism..." He traced the structures of the system based on degeneration experiments in apes and dogs as well as neurodegenerative diseases in humans.

However, it was not until 1937 when James Papez studied this system in detail that it became famous. Papez had been studying cases of rabies, which is a disease that causes high levels of aggression. He noticed that this heightened aggression correlated with damage to the hippocampus. Theoretically, this made sense to Papez who asserted that the hippocampus is responsible for the expression of emotion because of its connection to the autonomic nervous system. He also noticed that in other cases, certain stimuli (taste, smell, pain, etc.) would cause strong emotional responses. These stimuli activated not only the hippocampus but also other brain structures. He theorized that these brain structures worked together as the emotional control center in the brain and consequently founded the Papez circuit. Because of these studies, Papez strongly believed that the circuit was the cortical control of emotion.

Around the same time, Paul D. MacLean was also interested in the Papez circuit. He had read through Paul Broca's research which indicated that the limbic lobe that surrounds the brainstem is a structure present in all mammals. Papez's paper on the emotional circuit which involved the connection between the hypothalamus and the limbic lobe set MacLean on a journey to learn more. He visited Papez at Cornell University after which he proposed a modified version of the Papez circuit in 1952, emphasizing not only the hippocampus, but also the amygdala and septum.

The hippocampus, amygdala, and septum make up the rhinencephalon (frontotemporal portion of the brain) or, as Jakob termed it, the visceral brain. Together, the limbic lobe and the visceral brain make up the limbic system. MacLean believed that including the visceral brain in the limbic system accounted for the external sensory information associated with subjective emotional experiences. Since the limbic system consists of evolutionary primitive structures which prevents its interpretation verbally, the visceral brain accounts for the visual, auditory, olfactory, and other external sensory inputs that are associated with emotions.

Recently, many studies have been done to analyze the anatomy and function of the Papez circuit. Many scientists have been finding proof that the circuit is related to memory as well as emotion. The limbic system, the modified version of the circuit proposed by MacLean, is thought to be involved in the same functions as well as behavior, motivation, and olfaction.
