= Mammillotegmental fasciculus =

Details
- Part of: Midbrain
- System: Limbic

Identifiers
- Latin: fasciculus mammillotegmentalis
- NeuroNames: 423
- TA98: A14.1.08.953
- TA2: 5758
- FMA: 62058

The mammillotegmental fasciculus (mammillotegmental tract, or mammillotegmental bundle of Gudden) is a small bundle of efferent fibers from the hypothalamus running from the mammillary body to the tegmentum. Its functions are not well defined for humans, but based on animal studies it seems to be related to regulating visceral function and processing spatial information. The mammillotegmental fasciculus was first described by the German neuroanatomist, Bernhard von Gudden, from which it takes its alternate name, mammillo-tegmental bundle of Gudden.

The mammillotegmental fasciculus emerges from the principal mammillary fasciculus of the mammillary body and travels dorsally together with the mammillothalamic tract before splitting off and turning caudally to enter the spinal column. There, it terminates in the tegmentum of the midbrain at the dorsal and ventral tegmental nuclei and the tegmental pontine reticular nucleus.
