= Lateral vestibular nucleus =

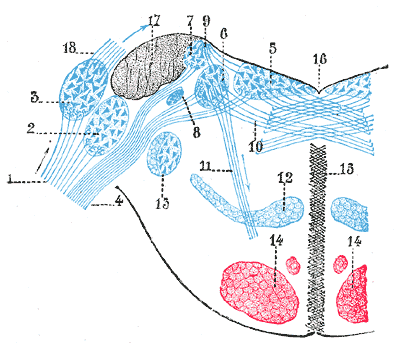
- Terminal nuclei of the vestibular nerve, with their upper connections. (Schematic.): 1. Cochlear nerve, with its two nuclei 2. Accessory nucleus 3. Tuberculum acusticum 4. Vestibular nerve 5. Internal nucleus 6. Nucleus of Deiters; 7. Nucleus of Bechterew; 8. Inferior or descending root of acoustic 9. Ascending cerebellar fibers 10. Fibers going to raphé 11. Fibers taking an oblique course 12. Lemniscus; 13. Inferior sensory root of trigeminal 14. Pyramidal tracts 15. Raphé; 16. Fourth ventricle 17. Inferior peduncle. Origin of striae medullares.

Details

Identifiers
- Latin: nucleus vestibularis lateralis
- MeSH: D003689
- NeuroNames: 716
- NeuroLex ID: nlx_144002
- TA98: A14.1.05.427
- TA2: 5935
- FMA: 54614

The lateral vestibular nucleus (Deiters's nucleus) is the continuation upward and lateralward of the principal nucleus, and in it terminate many of the ascending branches of the vestibular nerve.

== Structure ==
It consists of very large multipolar cells whose axons form an important part of the posterior longitudinal bundle (a.k.a. medial longitudinal fasciculus) of the same and the opposite side.

The axons bifurcate as they enter the posterior longitudinal bundle,

- the ascending branches send terminals and collaterals to the motor nuclei of the abducens, trochlear and oculomotor nerves via the ascending component of the medial longitudinal fasciculus, and are concerned in coordinating the movements of the eyes with alterations in the position of the head;
- the descending branches pass down in the posterior longitudinal bundle into the anterior funiculus of the spinal cord as the vestibulospinal fasciculus (anterior marginal bundle) and are distributed to motor nuclei of the anterior column by terminals and collaterals.

Other fibers are said to pass directly to the vestibulospinal fasciculus without passing into the posterior longitudinal bundle.

The fibers which pass into the vestibulospinal fasciculus are intimately concerned with equilibratory reflexes.

Other axons from Deiters’s nucleus are supposed to cross and ascend in the opposite medial lemniscus to the ventro-lateral nuclei of the thalamus; still other fibers pass into the cerebellum with the inferior peduncle and are distributed to the cortex of the vermis and the roof nuclei of the cerebellum; according to Cajal they merely pass through the nucleus fastigii on their way to the cortex of the vermis and the hemisphere.

== History ==
=== Eponym ===
Deiter's nucleus was named after German neuroanatomist Otto Friedrich Karl Deiters (1834–1863).
