= Lateral nucleus =

Lateral nucleus may refer to:

- Lateral hypothalamus
- Lateral vestibular nucleus
