= DTN =

DTN or DtN may refer to:

== Arts and entertainment ==
- Daniel Tiger's Neighborhood, a children's musical TV series (first shown 2012)
- Daystar Television Network, an American Christian broadcaster (founded 1993)
- Dictius Te Necare, a 1996 album by German black metal band Bethlehem
- Down to Nothing, an American straight-edge hardcore band (formed 2000)

== Transport ==
- Shreveport Downtown Airport, Louisiana, US (by IATA code)
- Denton railway station, Greater Manchester, England (by GBR code)

== Other uses ==
- DTN (company), American provider of specialized news services (founded 1984)
- Decision Theater North, an immersive visualization space in Alaska, US
- Delay-tolerant networking, in computing
- Dorsal tegmental nucleus, in the brain
