= James Papez =

American neuroanatomist

James Wenceslas Papez (/peɪpz/ 1883–1958) was an American neuroanatomist, most famous for his 1937 description of the Papez circuit, a neural pathway in the brain thought to be involved in the cortical control of emotion.

Specifically, Papez hypothesized that the hippocampus, the cingulate gyrus (Broca's callosal lobe), the hypothalamus, the anterior thalamic nuclei, and the interconnections among these structures constituted a harmonious mechanism which elaborate the functions of emotions. Papez never mentioned Broca's limbic lobe but others noted that his circuit was very similar to Broca's great limbic lobe.

Papez received his MD from the University of Minnesota College of Medicine and Surgery. He was a neurologist at Cornell University and curator of the Wilder Brain Collection when he published his 1937 journal article.

== See also ==
- Papez circuit
- Paul Broca
- Paul D. MacLean
- Limbic system
- Affective neuroscience
- Wilder Brain Collection
