= Pontine tegmentum =

Region of the brainstem

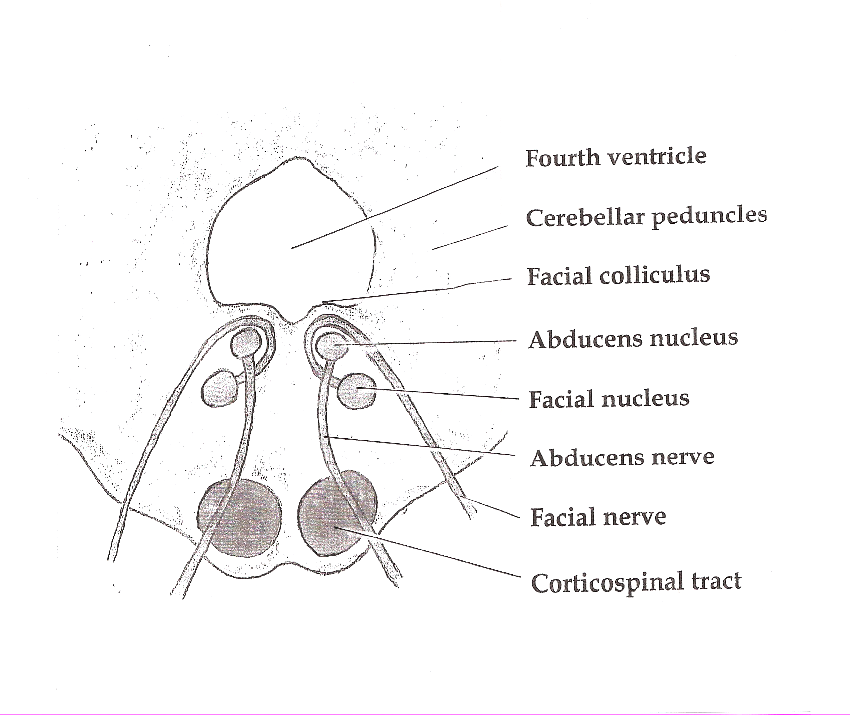
- Brainstem -- tegmentum not labeled, but is visible near center

Details

Identifiers
- Latin: tegmentum pontis
- MeSH: D065821
- NeuroNames: 557
- NeuroLex ID: birnlex_923
- TA98: A14.1.05.301
- TA2: 5929
- FMA: 71108

The pontine tegmentum, or dorsal pons, is the dorsal part of the pons located within the brainstem. The ventral part or ventral pons is known as the basilar part of the pons, or basilar pons. Along with the dorsal surface of the medulla oblongata, it forms part of the rhomboid fossa – the floor of the fourth ventricle.

The pontine tegmentum is all the material dorsal from the basilar pons to the fourth ventricle, and includes the reticulotegmental nucleus, the pedunculopontine nucleus, the laterodorsal tegmental nucleus, and several cranial nerve nuclei. It also houses the pontine respiratory group of the respiratory center which includes the pneumotaxic centre, and the apneustic centre.

== Anatomy ==
The pontine tegmentum contains nuclei of the cranial nerves (trigeminal (5th), abducens (6th), facial (7th), and vestibulocochlear (8th) and their associated fibre tracts. The dorsal pons also contains the reticulotegmental nucleus, the mesopontine cholinergic system comprising the pedunculopontine nucleus and the laterodorsal tegmental nucleus. In the respiratory center of the dorsal pons are the pontine respiratory group and the parabrachial nuclei in the pneumotaxic centre, and the apneustic centre. Nearby important structures include the cranial nerve nuclei of the oculomotor (3rd) and trochlear (4th) nerve nuclei, which are located in the midbrain. The pontine nuclei are located within the basilar pons. Also nearby are the raphe nuclei and the locus coeruleus, nuclei of cranial nerves 9-12, and the dorsal respiratory group, which are located further caudally in the brainstem. The dorsal respiratory group are connected to the pneumotaxic and apneustic centres of the pontine tegmentum.

== Function ==
Thanks to the number of different nuclei located within the pontine tegmentum, it is a region associated with a range of functions including sensory and motor functions (due to the cranial nuclei and fiber tracts), control of stages of sleep and levels of arousal and vigilance (due to the ascending cholinergic systems), and some aspects of respiratory control.

=== Functions of the cranial nerve nuclei ===
The pontine tegmentum contains nuclei of several cranial nerves and consequently has a role in several groups of sensory and motor processes.

- The principal sensory nucleus of the trigeminal nerve represents touch and position information of the head and face, but not the neck or back of the head, which are innervated by the cervical nerves. Pain and temperature information is also not represented within the principle nucleus, but rather in the spinal trigeminal nucleus, which is caudal to the pontine tegmentum in the medulla.
- The abducens nucleus controls abduction (outward rotation) of the eye.
- The facial motor nucleus and the superior salivary nucleus of the facial nerve are located within the pontine tegmentum. The facial motor nucleus serve motor control of the muscles of facial expression and the stapedius muscle of the ear, while the superior salivary nucleus controls the secretion of saliva and tears through parasympathetic innervation of structures including the lacrimal gland and the mucosal glands of the nose, palate, and pharynx. The facial solitary nucleus, which carries taste information from the anterior 2/3 of the tongue, is located caudal to the pontine tegmentum in the medulla.
- The superior vestibular nucleus, one of four vestibular nuclei, is located within the pons. The vestibular nuclei process information from the ear canals regarding the orientation and acceleration of the head. The remaining nuclei are located within the medulla.
- The two divisions of the cochlear nucleus, which process auditory input from the cochlea, lie on the border of the pons and the medulla. Some of the fibers from the cochlear nerve cross over in the pontine tegmentum, forming the trapezoid body, which is thought to help sound localisation.

=== Functions of the mesopontine cholinergic system ===
The pontine tegmentum contains two predominately cholinergic nuclei, the pedunculopontine nucleus (PPN) and the laterodorsal tegmental nucleus, which project widely throughout the brain.

The PPN is involved in many functions, including arousal, attention, learning, reward, voluntary limb movements and locomotion. While once thought important to the initiation of movement, studies suggest a role in providing sensory feedback to the cerebral cortex. Other studies have discovered that the PPN is involved in the planning of movement, and that different networks of neurons in the PPN are switched on during real and imagined movement.

It is also implicated in the generation and maintenance of REM sleep. In animal studies, lesions of the pontine tegmentum greatly reduce or even eliminate REM sleep. Injection of a cholinergic agonist (e.g. carbachol), into the pontine tegmentum produces a state of REM sleep in cats. PET studies seem to indicate that there is a correlation between blood flow in the pontine tegmentum and REM sleep

Pontine waves, (PGO waves) or P-waves in rodents, are brain waves generated in the pontine tegmentum. They can be observed in mammals to precede the onset of REM sleep, and continue throughout its course. After periods of memory training, P-wave density increases during subsequent sleep periods in rats. This may be an indication of a link between sleep and learning.

=== Function of the respiratory group ===
The two respiratory areas – the pneumotaxic center and the apneustic center make up the pontine respiratory group that provide antagonistic control signals to the dorsal respiratory group (DRG) located in the medulla. Increased input from the pneumotaxic center decreases the duration and increases the frequency of bursts of activity in the DRG, producing shorter and more frequent inhalations. The apneustic center delays the end of a burst in the DRG, extending periods of inhalation.

== See also ==
- Facial colliculus
