= Vestibulocerebellar tract =

Anatomical structure

Details

Identifiers
- Latin: fibrae vestibulocerebellares, tractus vestibulocerebellaris
- NeuroNames: 615
- NeuroLex ID: birnlex_1009

The vestibulocerebellar tract fibers are second-order fibers from the vestibular nuclei, and first-order fibers from the vestibular ganglion/nerve. They pass through the juxtarestiform body of the inferior cerebellar peduncle to reach the cerebellum, They terminate in the vestibulocerebellum, and part of the vermis as well as the dentate nucleus, and fastigial nucleus in each hemisphere They are involved in maintaining balance.

The first-order axons in the vestibulocerebellar tract terminate on the same side in the flocculonodular lobe; this direct projection to the cerebellum is a unique feature of the vestibular system.
