= Foramen singulare =

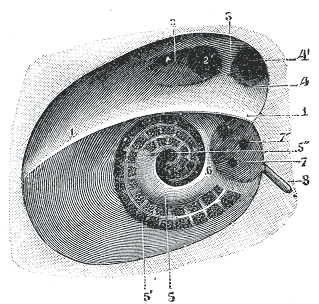
- Diagrammatic view of the fundus of the right internal acoustic meatus. (Testut.) 1. Falciform crest. 2. Area facialis, with (2’) internal opening of the facial canal. 3. Ridge separating the area facialis from the area cribrosa superior. 4. Area cribrosa superior, with (4’) openings for nerve filaments. 5. Anterior inferior cribriform area, with (5’) the tractus spiralis foraminosus, and (5’’) the canalis centralis of the cochlea. 6. Ridge separating the tractus spiralis foraminosus from the area cribrosa media. 7. Area cribrosa media, with (7’) orifices for nerves to saccule. 8. Foramen singulare.

Details
- Part of: Temporal bone

Identifiers
- Latin: Foramen singulare
- TA98: A15.3.03.052
- TA2: 6992
- FMA: 75352

The foramen singulare (also known as singular foramen or singular canal), is a foramen in the wall of the internal auditory meatus that gives passage to the branch of the inferior division of the vestibular nerve that innervates the ampulla of the posterior semicircular canal.

== Anatomy ==
The foramen singulare arises from the posteroinferior part of the fundus of the internal auditory canal. At its origin, it is medial to the inferior vestibular area. The canal has a total length of about 4mm and ends at the ampulla of the posterior semicircular canal.

== Clinical significance ==
It is an important surgical landmark during a retrosigmoid approach to the internal auditory canal. The foramen singulare houses the singular nerve, also called the posterior ampullary nerve, and is a branch of the inferior vestibular nerve. This nerve carries afferent information from the posterior semicircular canal.
