= Algedonic signal =

An algedonic signal is a pre-emptive message concerning pleasure or pain. An arousal mechanism can generate an algedonic signal, and thus provide an important survival mechanism to a living organism by alerting it to a threat. An example of the disastrous consequences of such a system not being in place is that of a moth attracted by the light of an open flame without recognising the danger of fire.

In the human nervous system a variety of algedonic signals are brought together in the midbrain reticular formation from across the whole body. A source of pain, such as touching a burning surface or treading on broken glass, creates such an algedonic signal which interrupts consciousness and provokes a reflex action.
