= Mammillary body =

Part of the limbic system

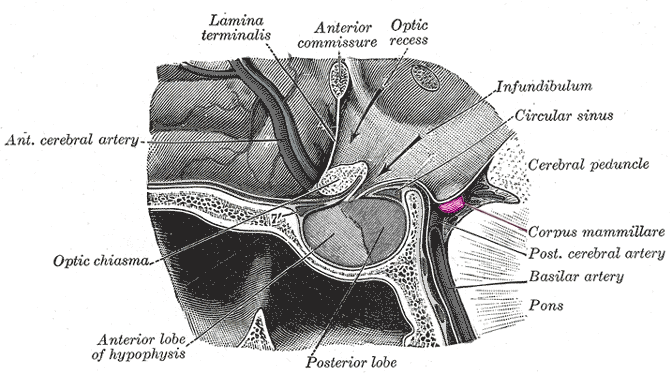
- Sagittal section, "Corpus mamillare" highlighted.

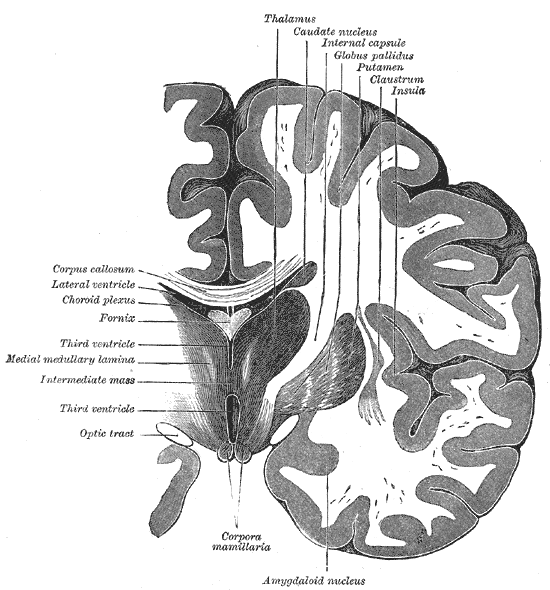
- Coronal section of brain through intermediate mass of third ventricle. (Label "Corpora mamillaria" at bottom.)

Details
- Part of: Diencephalon
- System: Limbic
- Parts: medial mammillary nucleus lateral mammillary nucleus

Identifiers
- Latin: corpus mamillare (plural: corpora mamillaria)
- Acronym: mmb
- MeSH: D008326
- NeuroNames: 412
- NeuroLex ID: birnlex_865
- TA98: A14.1.08.402
- TA2: 5674
- FMA: 74877

The mammillary bodies also mamillary bodies, are a pair of small round brainstem nuclei. They are located on the undersurface of the brain that, as part of the diencephalon, form part of the limbic system. They are located at the ends of the anterior arches of the fornix. They consist of two nuclei, the medial mammillary nuclei and the lateral mammillary nuclei.

Neuroanatomists have often categorized the mammillary bodies as part of the posterior part of hypothalamus.

== Structure ==
=== Connections ===
They are connected to other parts of the brain (as shown in the schematic, below left), and act as a relay for impulses coming from the amygdalae and hippocampi, via the mamillothalamic tract to the thalamus.

The lateral mammillary nucleus has bidirectional connections with the dorsal tegmental nucleus. The medial mammillary nucleus connects with the ventral tegmental nucleus.

== Function ==
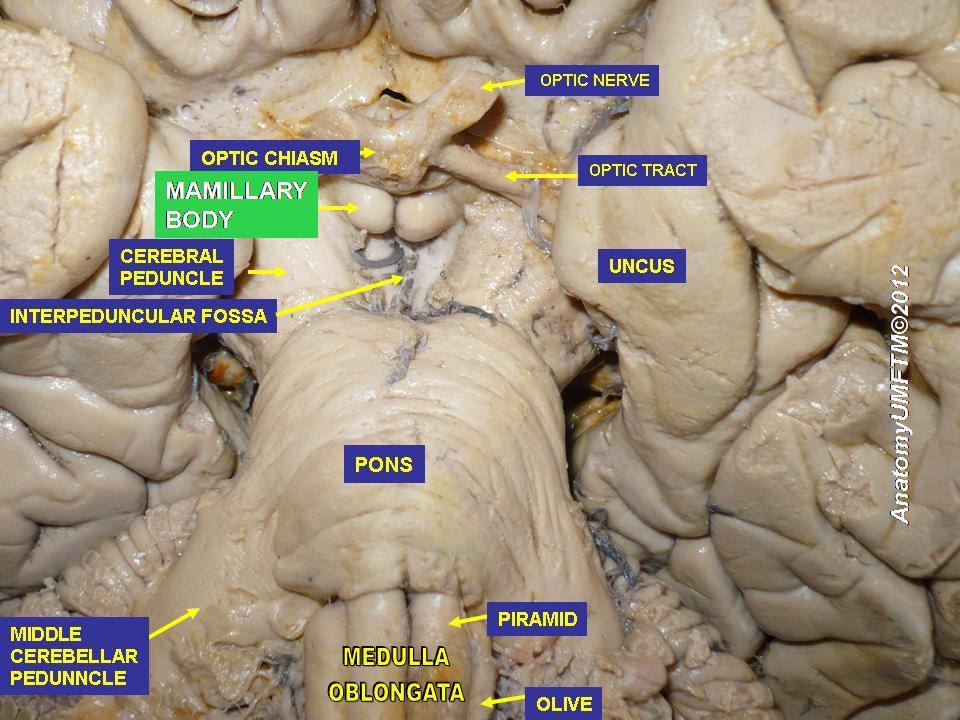
Mammillary body

Mammillary bodies, and their projections to the anterior thalamus via the mammillothalamic tract, are important for recollective memory. According to studies of rats with mammillary body lesions, damage to the medial mammillary nucleus lead to spatial memory deficits.

== Clinical significance ==
Damage to the mammillary bodies due to thiamine deficiency is implied in pathogenesis of Wernicke–Korsakoff syndrome. Symptoms include impaired memory, also called anterograde amnesia, suggesting that the mammillary bodies may be important for memory. Lesions of the medial dorsal and anterior nuclei of the thalami and lesions of the mammillary bodies are commonly involved in amnesic syndromes in humans.

Mammillary body atrophy is present in several other conditions, such as colloid cysts in the third ventricle, Alzheimer's disease, schizophrenia, heart failure, and sleep apnea. In spite of this the exact function of the mammillary bodies is still not clear.

== See also ==
- Mammillotegmental fasciculus
