= Limbic lobe =

Region of a cerebral cortex

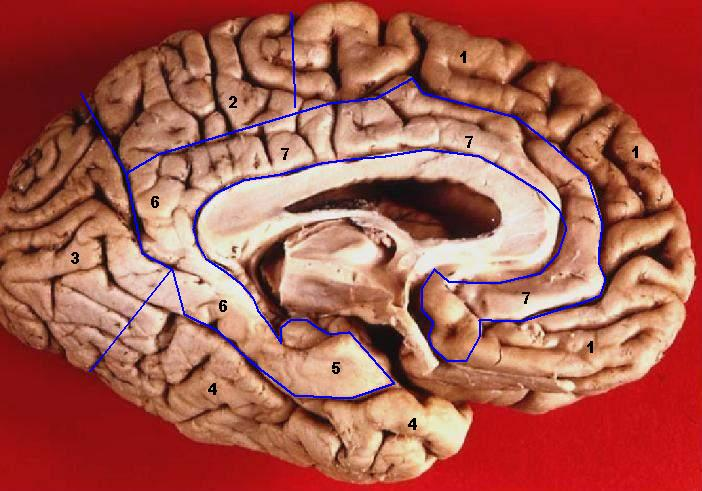
- Inferomedial view of the left cerebral hemisphere showing the limbic lobe in areas 5-7.

Details

Identifiers
- Latin: lobus limbicus gyrus fornicatus
- MeSH: D065726
- NeuroNames: 834
- NeuroLex ID: birnlex_1128
- TA98: A14.1.09.230
- TA2: 5507
- FMA: 72719

The limbic lobe is an arc-shaped cortical region of the limbic system, on the medial surface of each cerebral hemisphere of the mammalian brain, consisting of parts of the frontal, parietal and temporal lobes. The term is ambiguous, with some authors including the paraterminal gyrus, the subcallosal area, the cingulate gyrus, the parahippocampal gyrus, the dentate gyrus, the hippocampus and the subiculum;

== History ==
Broca named the limbic lobe in 1878, identifying it with the cingulate and parahippocampal gyri, and associating it with the sense of smell - Treviranus having earlier noted that, between species, the size of the parahippocampal gyrus varies with the size of the olfactory nerve. In 1937, Papez theorized that a neural circuit (the Papez circuit) including the hippocampal formation and the cingulate gyrus constitutes the neural substrate of emotional behavior, and Klüver and Bucy reported that, in monkeys, resection involving the hippocampal formation and the amygdaloid complex has a profound effect on emotional responses. As a consequence of these publications, the idea that the entire limbic lobe is dedicated to olfaction receded, and a direct connection between emotion and the limbic lobe was established.

== Gallery ==
Limbic lobe (shown in red) of left cerebral hemisphere.

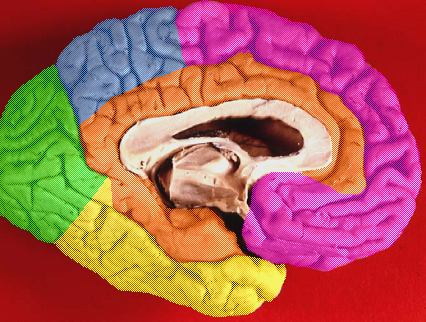
Limbic lobe (shown in orange) of left cerebral hemisphere.

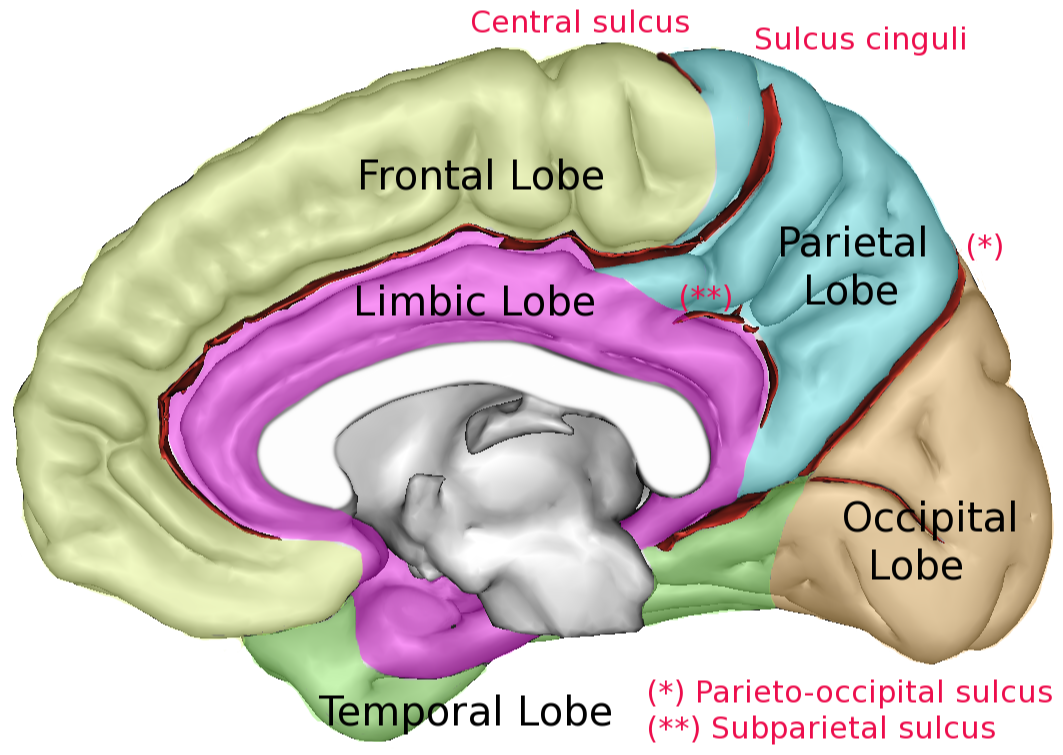
Limbic lobe (shown in purple) of right cerebral hemisphere.

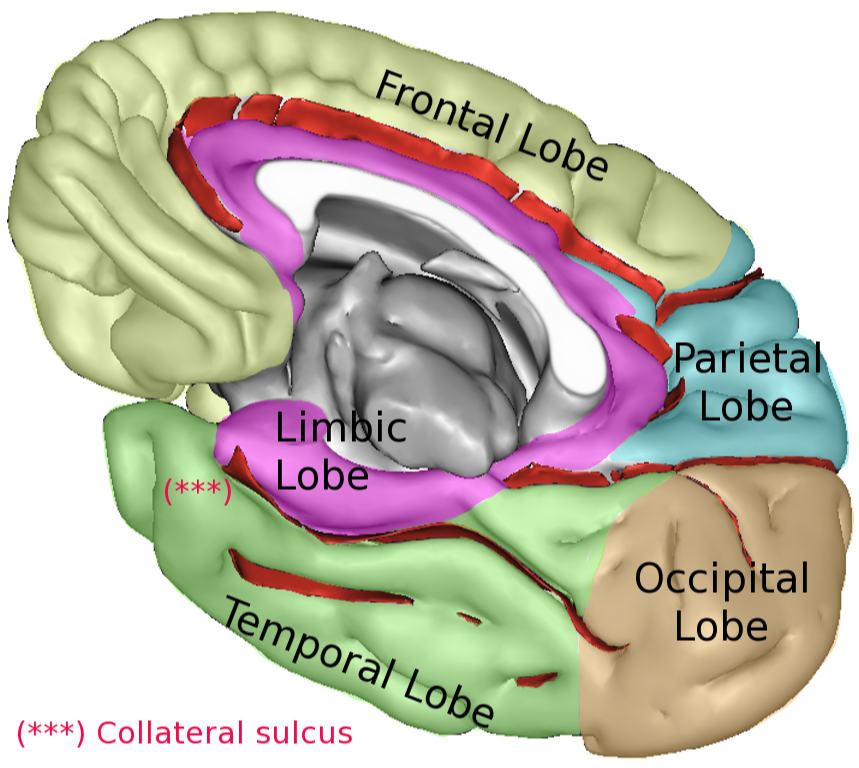
Limbic lobe (shown in purple) of right cerebral hemisphere.

Limbic lobe highlighted in green on coronal T1 MRI images

Limbic lobe highlighted in green on sagittal T1 MRI images

Limbic lobe highlighted in green on transversal T1 MRI images
