= Tegmental nucleus =

Tegmental nucleus may refer to:

- Laterodorsal tegmental nucleus
- Pedunculopontine nucleus or pedunculopontine tegmental nucleus
- Rostromedial tegmental nucleus
- Tegmental pontine reticular nucleus
