= Hypothalamotegmental tract =

The hypothalamotegmental tract is a pathway from the hypothalamus to the reticular formation. Axons from the posterior hypothalamus descend through the midbrain and pontine reticular formation. They connect with reticular neurons important in visceral and autonomic activity. The tract is a continuation of the medial forebrain bundle in the lateral portion of the tegmentum. It can only be seen with special staining.

== See also ==
- Mammillothalamic tract
- Medial forebrain bundle
- Midbrain reticular formation
