= Acoustic tubercle =

Part of the auditory system

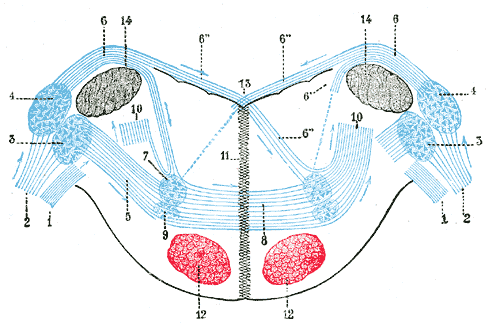
- Terminal nuclei of the cochlear nerve, with their upper connections. (Schematic.) The vestibular nerve with its terminal nuclei and their efferent fibers have been suppressed. On the other hand, in order not to obscure the trapezoid body, the efferent fibers of the terminal nuclei on the right side have been resected in a considerable portion of their extent. The trapezoid body, therefore, shows only one-half of its fibers—those that come from the left.: 1. Vestibular nerve, divided at its entrance into the medulla oblongata.; 2. Cochlear nerve.; 3. Accessory nucleus of acoustic nerve.; 4. Tuberculum acusticum.; 5. Efferent fibers of accessory nucleus.; 6. Efferent fibers of tuberculum acusticum, forming the striae medullares, with 6’, their direct bundle going to the superior olivary nucleus of the same side; 6’’, their decussating bundles going to the superior olivary nucleus of the opposite side.; 7. Superior olivary nucleus.; 8. Trapezoid body.; 9. Trapezoid nucleus.; 10. Central acoustic tract (lateral lemniscus).; 11. Raphé.; 12. Pyramidal tracts.; 13. Fourth ventricle.; 14. Inferior peduncle.

Details

Identifiers
- Latin: tuberculum acusticum

The acoustic tubercle is a nucleus on the end of the cochlear nerve.

The cochlear nerve is lateral to the root of the vestibular nerve. Its fibers end in two nuclei: one, the accessory nucleus, lies immediately in front of the inferior peduncle; the other, the acoustic tubercle, somewhat lateral to it.
