= Limbic system =

Set of brain structures involved in emotion and motivation

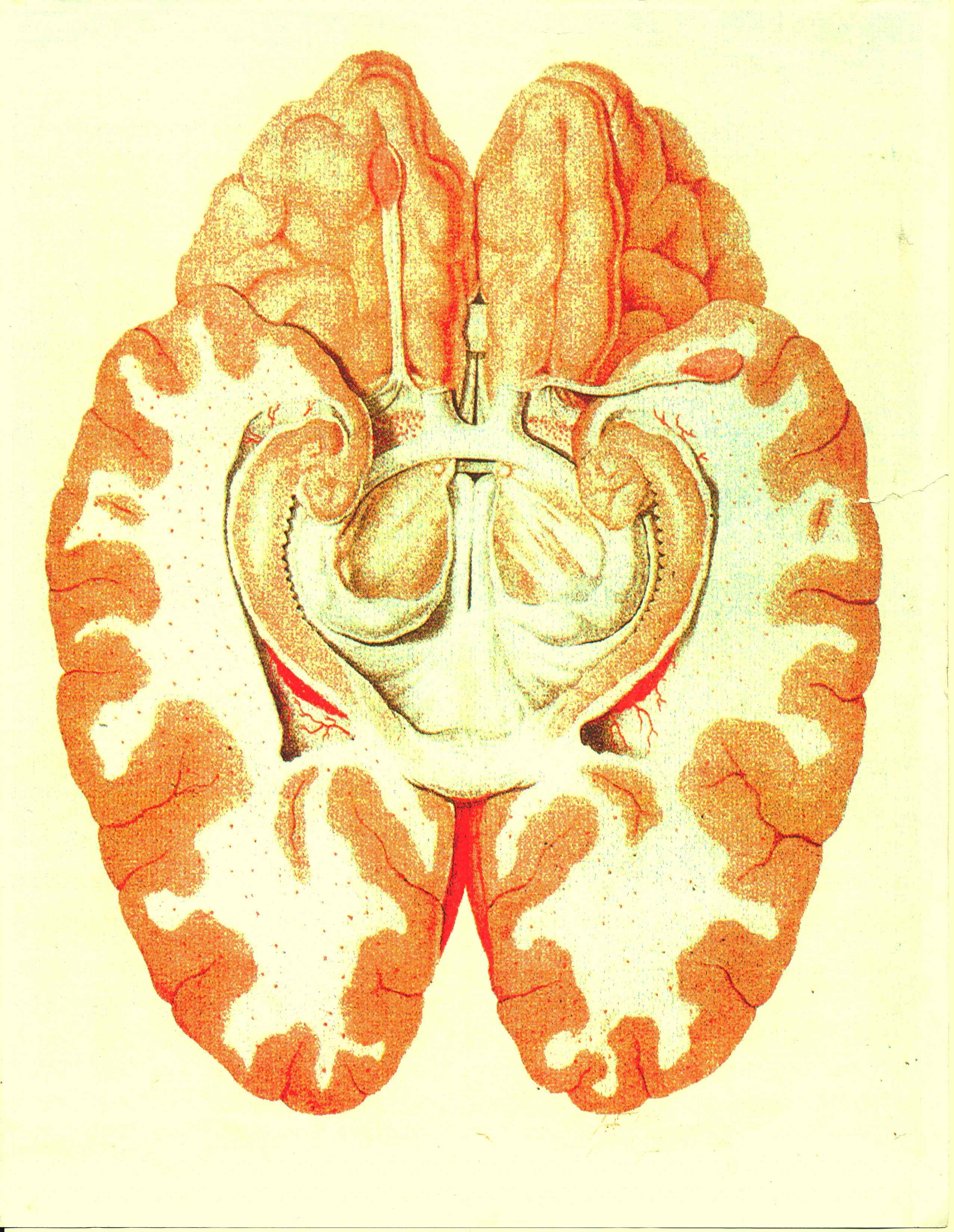
- Cross section of the human brain showing parts of the limbic system from below. Traité d'Anatomie et de Physiologie (1786)

- The limbic system largely consists of what was previously known as the limbic lobe.

Details

Identifiers
- Latin: systema limbicum
- MeSH: D008032
- NeuroNames: 2055
- FMA: 242000

The limbic system, also known as the paleomammalian cortex, is a set of brain structures involved in emotional processing and motivation in humans and many other animals. In humans it is located on both sides of the thalamus, immediately beneath the medial temporal lobe of the cerebrum primarily in the forebrain.

Its various components support a variety of functions including emotion, behavior, long-term memory, and olfaction.

The limbic system is involved in lower order emotional processing of input from sensory systems and consists of the amygdala, mammillary bodies, stria medullaris, central gray and dorsal and ventral nuclei of Gudden. This processed information is often relayed to a collection of structures from the telencephalon, diencephalon, and mesencephalon, including the prefrontal cortex, cingulate gyrus, limbic thalamus, hippocampus including the parahippocampal gyrus and subiculum, nucleus accumbens (limbic striatum), anterior hypothalamus, ventral tegmental area, midbrain raphe nuclei, habenular commissure, entorhinal cortex, and olfactory bulbs.

== Structure ==
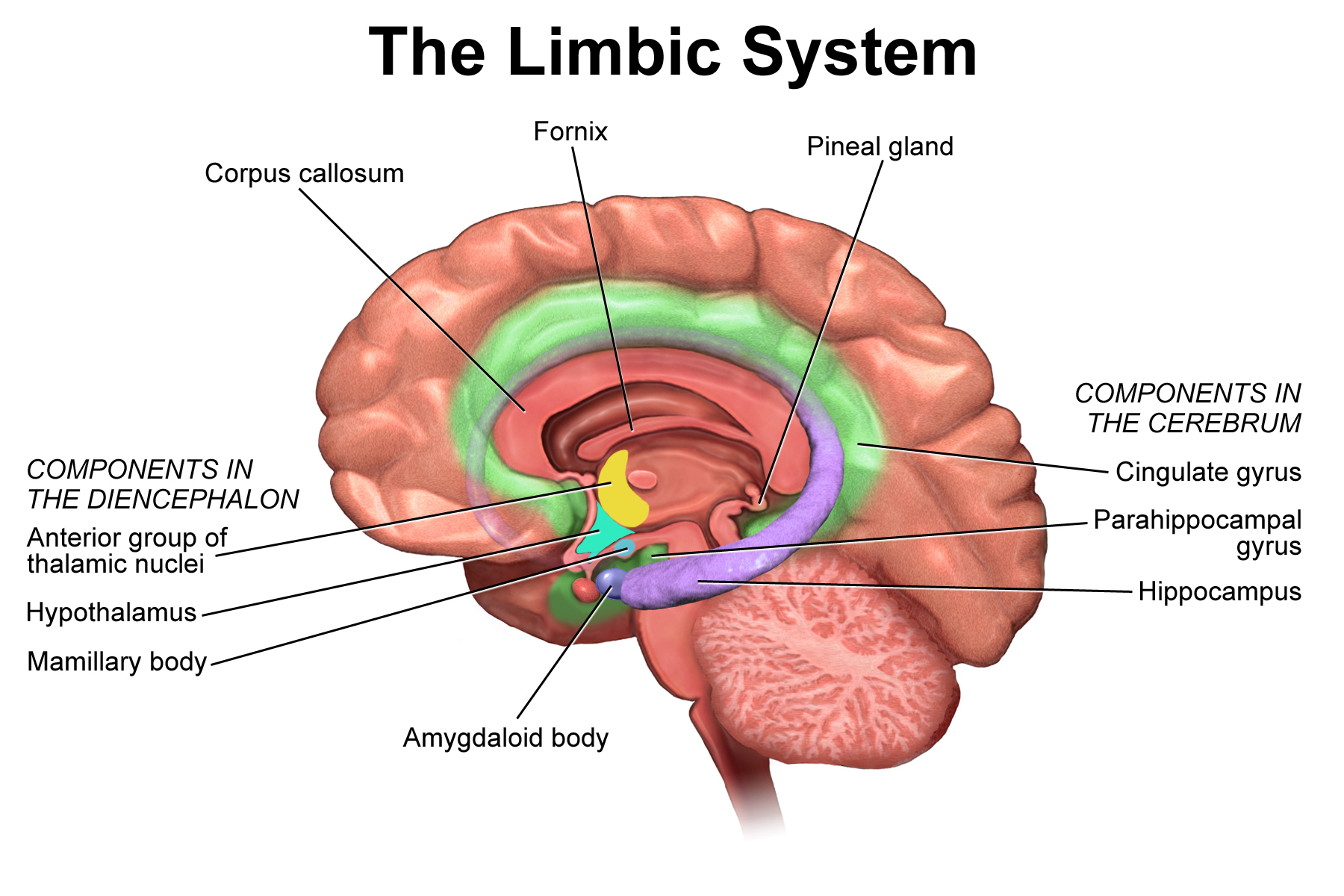
Anatomical components of the limbic system

The limbic lobe was originally defined by the French anatomist Paul Broca in 1878, as a series of cortical structures surrounding the boundary between the cerebral hemispheres and the brainstem. The name "limbic" comes from the Latin word for the border, limbus. Further studies began to associate these areas with emotional and motivational processes and linked them to subcortical components that were then grouped into the limbic system.

In recent years, multiple additional limbic fiber connectivity has been revealed using diffusion-weighted MRI. The equivalent fiber connectivity of all these pathways has been documented by dissection studies in primates. Some of these fiber tracts include the amygdalofugal tract, amygdalothalamic tract, stria terminalis, dorsal thalamo-hypothalamic tract, cerebellohypothalamic tracts, and the parieto-occipito-hypothalamic tract.

Currently, it is not considered an isolated entity responsible for the neurological regulation of emotion, but rather one of the many parts of the brain that regulate visceral autonomic processes. Therefore, the set of anatomical structures considered part of the limbic system is controversial. The following structures are, or have been considered, part of the limbic system:

- Cortical areas:
  - Limbic lobe
  - Orbitofrontal cortex: a region in the frontal lobe involved in the process of decision-making
  - Piriform cortex: part of the olfactory system
  - Entorhinal cortex: related to memory and associative components
  - Fornix: a white matter structure connecting the hippocampus with other brain structures, particularly the mammillary bodies and septal nuclei
- Subcortical areas:
  - Septal nuclei: a set of structures that lie in front of the lamina terminalis, considered a pleasure zone
  - Hippocampus and associated structures: play a central role in the consolidation of new memories
  - Amygdala: located deep within the temporal lobes and related with a number of emotional processes
  - Nucleus accumbens: involved in reward, pleasure, and addiction
- Diencephalic structures:
  - Hypothalamus: a center for the limbic system, connected with the frontal lobes, septal nuclei, and the brain stem reticular formation via the medial forebrain bundle, with the hippocampus via the fornix, and with the thalamus via the mammillothalamic fasciculus; regulates many autonomic processes
  - Mammillary bodies: part of the hypothalamus that receives signals from the hippocampus via the fornix and projects them to the thalamus
  - Anterior nuclei of thalamus: receive input from the mammillary bodies and involved in memory processing

== Function ==
The structures and interacting areas of the limbic system are involved in motivation, emotion, learning, and memory. The limbic system is where the subcortical structures meet the cerebral cortex. The limbic system operates by influencing the endocrine system and the autonomic nervous system. It is highly interconnected with the nucleus accumbens, which plays a role in sexual arousal and the "high" derived from certain recreational drugs. These responses are heavily modulated by dopaminergic projections from the limbic system. In 1954, Olds and Milner found that rats with metal electrodes implanted into their nucleus accumbens, as well as their septal nuclei, repeatedly pressed a lever activating this region.

The limbic system also interacts with the basal ganglia. The basal ganglia are a set of subcortical structures that direct intentional movements as well as higher cognitive functions through regulating thalamocortical loops. The basal ganglia are located near the thalamus and hypothalamus. They receive input from the cerebral cortex and output to thalamic nuclei. A part of the basal ganglia called the striatum controls posture and movement. Recent studies indicate that if there is an inadequate supply of dopamine in the striatum, this can lead to the symptoms of Parkinson's disease.

The limbic system is also tightly connected to the prefrontal cortex. This connectivity has been demonstrated to play a role in memory consolidation, emotional processing, and interoception-driven behavior. To cure severe emotional disorders, this connection was sometimes surgically severed, a procedure of psychosurgery, called a prefrontal lobotomy (this is actually a misnomer). Patients having undergone this procedure often became passive and lacked all motivation.

The limbic system interacts heavily with the cerebral cortex. These interactions are closely linked to olfaction, emotions, drives, autonomic regulation, memory, and pathologically to encephalopathy, epilepsy, psychotic symptoms, cognitive defects. The functional relevance of the limbic system has proven to serve many different functions such as affects/emotions, memory, sensory processing, time perception, attention, consciousness, instincts, autonomic/vegetative control, and actions/motor behavior. Some of the disorders associated with the limbic system and its interacting components are epilepsy and schizophrenia.

=== Hippocampus ===
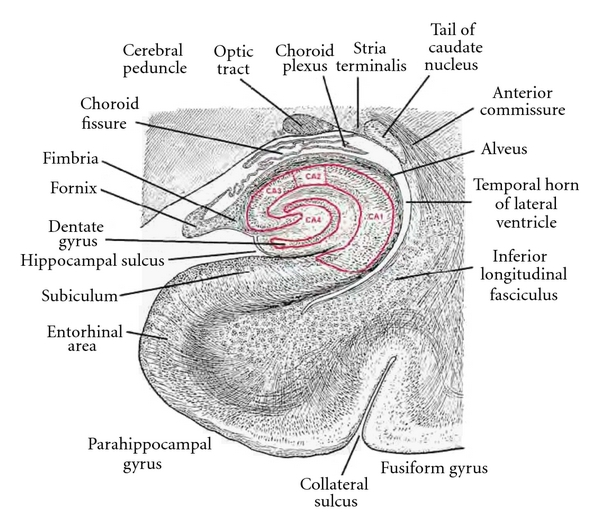
Location and basic anatomy of the hippocampus, as a coronal section

The hippocampus is involved with various processes relating to cognition and is one of the best understood and heavily involved limbic interacting structures.

==== Spatial memory ====
The first and most widely researched area concerns memory, particularly spatial memory. Spatial memory was found to have many sub-regions in the hippocampus, such as the dentate gyrus (DG) in the dorsal hippocampus, the left hippocampus, and the parahippocampal region. The dorsal hippocampus was found to be an important component for the generation of new neurons, called adult-born granules (GC), in adolescence and adulthood. These new neurons contribute to pattern separation in spatial memory, increasing the firing in cell networks, and overall causing stronger memory formations. This is thought to integrate spatial and episodic memories with the limbic system via a feedback loop that provides emotional context of a particular sensory input.

While the dorsal hippocampus is involved in spatial memory formation, the left hippocampus is a participant in the recall of these spatial memories. Eichenbaum and his team found, when studying the hippocampal lesions in rats, that the left hippocampus is "critical for effectively combining the 'what', 'when', and 'where' qualities of each experience to compose the retrieved memory". This makes the left hippocampus a key component in the retrieval of spatial memory. However, Spreng found that the left hippocampus is a general concentrated region for binding together bits and pieces of memory composed not only by the hippocampus, but also by other areas of the brain to be recalled at a later time. Eichenbaum's research in 2007 also demonstrates that the parahippocampal area of the hippocampus is another specialized region for the retrieval of memories just like the left hippocampus.

==== Learning ====
The hippocampus, over the decades, has also been found to have a huge impact in learning. Curlik and Shors examined the effects of neurogenesis in the hippocampus and its effects on learning. This researcher and his team employed many different types of mental and physical training on their subjects, and found that the hippocampus is highly responsive to these latter tasks. Thus, they discovered an upsurge of new neurons and neural circuits in the hippocampus as a result of the training, causing an overall improvement in the learning of the task. This neurogenesis contributes to the creation of adult-born granules cells (GC), cells also described by Eichenbaum in his own research on neurogenesis and its contributions to learning. The creation of these cells exhibited "enhanced excitability" in the dentate gyrus (DG) of the dorsal hippocampus, impacting the hippocampus and its contribution to the learning process.

==== Hippocampus damage ====
Damage related to the hippocampal region of the brain has reported vast effects on overall cognitive functioning, particularly memory such as spatial memory. As previously mentioned, spatial memory is a cognitive function greatly intertwined with the hippocampus. While damage to the hippocampus may be a result of a brain injury or other injuries of that sort, researchers particularly investigated the effects that high emotional arousal and certain types of drugs had on the recall ability in this specific memory type. In particular, in a study performed by Parkard, rats were given the task of correctly making their way through a maze. In the first condition, rats were stressed by shock or restraint which caused a high emotional arousal. When completing the maze task, these rats had an impaired effect on their hippocampal-dependent memory when compared to the control group. Then, in a second condition, a group of rats were injected with anxiogenic drugs. Like the former these results reported similar outcomes, in that hippocampal-memory was also impaired. Studies such as these reinforce the impact that the hippocampus has on memory processing, in particular the recall function of spatial memory. Furthermore, impairment to the hippocampus can occur from prolonged exposure to stress hormones such as glucocorticoids (GCs), which target the hippocampus and cause disruption in explicit memory.

In an attempt to curtail life-threatening epileptic seizures, 27-year-old Henry Gustav Molaison underwent bilateral removal of almost all of his hippocampus in 1953. Over the course of fifty years he participated in thousands of tests and research projects that provided specific information on exactly what he had lost. Semantic and episodic events faded within minutes, having never reached his long-term memory, yet emotions, unconnected from the details of causation, were often retained. Dr. Suzanne Corkin, who worked with him for 46 years until his death, described the contribution of this tragic "experiment" in her 2013 book.

=== Amygdala ===
==== Episodic-autobiographical memory (EAM) networks ====
Another integrative part of the limbic system, the amygdala, which is the deepest part of the limbic system, is involved in many cognitive processes and is largely considered the most primordial and vital part of the limbic system. Like the hippocampus, processes in the amygdala seem to impact memory; however, it is not spatial memory as in the hippocampus but the semantic division of episodic-autobiographical memory (EAM) networks. Markowitsch's amygdala research shows it encodes, stores, and retrieves EAM memories. To delve deeper into these types of processes by the amygdala, Markowitsch and his team provided extensive evidence through investigations that the "amygdala's main function is to charge cues so that mnemonic events of a specific emotional significance can be successfully searched within the appropriate neural nets and re-activated." These cues for emotional events created by the amygdala encompass the EAM networks previously mentioned.

Neurons in the amygdala encode the valence and salience of fear and reward cues. Limited research indicates that valence is encoded by non-overlapping cell populations in the amygdala, while salience is encoded by overlapping cell populations. These neurons project to various brain regions to modulate attention and motivated behavior, such as threat avoidance, reward seeking, and emotional memory acquisition.

While the amygdala is involved in both fear- and reward-related behaviors, most research into this brain area focuses on its role in processing fear. For instance, the artificial activation or inhibition of the amygdala produces anxiolytic or anxiogenic behaviors, respectively. Distinct cell populations in the amygdala encode fear memory, thereby being necessary for the acquisition of this form of memory. Research efforts into the role of this signaling in neuropsychiatric disease have established its link to aberrant fear and anxiety. A separate population of amygdala neurons project to dopaminergic reward circuitry to mediate reward-associated memory, as cellular activity in this region encodes cues that predict reward.

==== Social processing ====
Social processing, specifically the evaluation of faces in social processing, is an area of cognition specific to the amygdala. In a study done by Todorov, fMRI tasks were performed with participants to evaluate whether the amygdala was involved in the general evaluation of faces. After the study, Todorov concluded from his fMRI results that the amygdala did indeed play a key role in the general evaluation of faces. However, in a study performed by researchers Koscik and his team, the trait of trustworthiness was particularly examined in the evaluation of faces. Koscik and his team demonstrated that the amygdala was involved in evaluating the trustworthiness of an individual. They investigated how brain damage to the amygdala played a role in trustworthiness, and found that individuals with damaged amygdalas tended to confuse trust and betrayal, and thus placed trust in those having done them wrong. Furthermore, Rule, along with his colleagues, expanded on the idea of the amygdala in its critique of trustworthiness in others by performing a study in 2009 in which he examined the amygdala's role in evaluating general first impressions and relating them to real-world outcomes. Their study involved first impressions of CEOs. Rule demonstrated that while the amygdala did play a role in the evaluation of trustworthiness, as observed by Koscik in his own research two years later in 2011, the amygdala also played a generalized role in the overall evaluation of first impression of faces. This latter conclusion, along with Todorov's study on the amygdala's role in general evaluations of faces and Koscik's research on trustworthiness and the amygdala, further solidified evidence that the amygdala plays a role in overall social processing.

==== Klüver–Bucy syndrome ====
Based on experiments done on monkeys, the destruction of the temporal cortex almost always led to damage of the amygdala. This damage done to the amygdala led the physiologists Kluver and Bucy to pinpoint major changes in the behavior of the monkeys. The monkeys demonstrated the following changes:

1. The monkeys would no longer exhibit responses of fear or anger.
2. The monkeys would inspect and physically touch all objects placed in front of them.
3. The monkeys forgot rapidly.
4. The monkeys had a tendency to orally examine objects (e.g. biting, licking, etc.).
5. The monkeys would respond, as if required to, to every stimulus (i.e. Hypermetamorphosis (psychology)).
6. The monkeys exhibited hypersexuality, demonstrating a sexual drive so strong that they would continuously stimulate their genitalia, copulate repeatedly and for long periods of time, and sometimes sustain small injuries in the process (e.g. due to excessive biting).

This set of behavioral change came to be known as the Klüver–Bucy syndrome.

== Evolutionary claims ==
Paul D. MacLean, as part of his triune brain theory (which is now considered outdated), hypothesized that the limbic system is older than other parts of the forebrain, and that it developed to manage circuitry attributed to the fight or flight first identified by Hans Selye in his report of the General Adaptation Syndrome in 1936. It may be considered a part of survival adaptation in reptiles as well as mammals (including humans). MacLean postulated that the human brain has evolved three components, that evolved successively, with more recent components developing at the top/front. These components are, respectively:

1. The archipallium or primitive ("reptilian") brain, comprising the structures of the brain stem – medulla, pons, cerebellum, mesencephalon, the oldest basal nuclei – the globus pallidus and the olfactory bulbs.
2. The paleopallium or intermediate ("old mammalian") brain, comprising the structures of the limbic system.
3. The neopallium, also known as the superior or rational ("new mammalian") brain, comprises almost the whole of the hemispheres (made up of a more recent type of cortex, called neocortex) and some subcortical neuronal groups. It corresponds to the brain of the superior mammals, thus including the primates and, as a consequence, the human species. Similar development of the neocortex in mammalian species not closely related to humans and primates has also occurred, for example in cetaceans and elephants; thus the designation of "superior mammals" is not an evolutionary one, as it has occurred independently in different species. The evolution of higher degrees of intelligence is an example of convergent evolution, and is also seen in non-mammals such as birds.

According to Maclean, each of the components, although connected with the others, retained "their peculiar types of intelligence, subjectivity, sense of time and space, memory, mobility and other less specific functions".

However, while the categorization into structures is reasonable, the recent studies of the limbic system of tetrapods, both living and extinct, have challenged several aspects of this hypothesis, notably the accuracy of the terms "reptilian" and "old mammalian". The common ancestors of reptiles and mammals had a well-developed limbic system in which the basic subdivisions and connections of the amygdalar nuclei were established. Further, birds, which evolved from the dinosaurs, which in turn evolved separately but around the same time as the mammals, have a well-developed limbic system. While the anatomic structures of the limbic system are different in birds and mammals, there are functional equivalents.

== History ==
=== Etymology and history ===
The term limbic comes from the Latin limbus, for "border" or "edge", or, particularly in medical terminology, a border of an anatomical component. Paul Broca coined the term based on its physical location in the brain, sandwiched between two functionally different components.

The limbic system is a term that was introduced in 1949 by the American physician and neuroscientist, Paul D. MacLean. The French physician Paul Broca first called this part of the brain le grand lobe limbique in 1878. He examined the differentiation between deeply recessed cortical tissue and underlying, subcortical nuclei. However, most of its putative role in emotion was developed only in 1937 when the American physician James Papez described his anatomical model of emotion, the Papez circuit.

The first evidence that the limbic system was responsible for the cortical representation of emotions was discovered in 1939, by Heinrich Kluver and Paul Bucy. Kluver and Bucy, after much research, demonstrated that the bilateral removal of the temporal lobes in monkeys created an extreme behavioral syndrome. After performing a temporal lobectomy, the monkeys showed a decrease in aggression. The animals revealed a reduced threshold to visual stimuli, and were thus unable to recognize objects that were once familiar. MacLean expanded these ideas to include additional structures in a more dispersed "limbic system", more on the lines of the system described above. MacLean developed the theory of the "triune brain" to explain its evolution and to try to reconcile rational human behavior with its more "primal" and "violent" side. He became interested in the brain's control of emotion and behavior. After initial studies of brain activity in epileptic patients, he turned to cats, monkeys, and other models, using electrodes to stimulate different parts of the brain in conscious animals recording their responses.

In the 1950s, he began to trace individual behaviors like aggression and sexual arousal to their physiological sources. He postulated the limbic system as the brain's center of emotions, including the hippocampus and amygdala. Developing observations made by Papez, he hypothesized that the limbic system had evolved in early mammals to control fight-or-flight responses and react to both emotionally pleasurable and painful sensations. The concept is now broadly accepted in neuroscience. Additionally, MacLean said that the idea of the limbic system leads to a recognition that its presence "represents the history of the evolution of mammals and their distinctive family way of life."

In the 1960s, Dr. MacLean enlarged his theory to address the human brain's overall structure and divided its evolution into three parts, an idea that he termed the triune brain. In addition to identifying the limbic system, he hypothesized a supposedly more primitive brain called the R-complex, related to reptiles, which controls basic functions like muscle movement and breathing. According to him, the third part, the neocortex, controls speech and reasoning and is the most recent evolutionary arrival. The concept of the limbic system has since been further expanded and developed by Walle Nauta, Lennart Heimer, and others.

=== Academic dispute ===
There is controversy over the use of the term limbic system, with scientists such as Joseph E. LeDoux and Edmund Rolls arguing that the term be considered obsolete and abandoned. Originally, the limbic system was believed to be the emotional center of the brain, with cognition being the business of the neocortex. However, cognition depends on acquisition and retention of memories, in which the hippocampus, a primary limbic interacting structure, is involved: hippocampus damage causes severe cognitive (memory) deficits. More important, the "boundaries" of the limbic system have been repeatedly redefined because of advances in neuroscience. Therefore, while it is true that limbic interacting structures are more closely related to emotion, the limbic system itself is best thought of as a component of a larger emotional processing plant.

== See also ==
- Amygdala hijack
- Emotional memory
- Hypothalamic-pituitary-adrenal axis (HPA axis)
- Paralimbic cortex
- Triune brain
- Fundamentals of Neuroscience course at Wikiversity
