= Mammillothalamic tract =

Details

Identifiers
- Latin: tractus mammillothalamicus
- TA98: A14.1.08.671; A14.1.08.954
- TA2: 5757
- FMA: 83849

The mammillothalamic tract (MMT) (also mammillary fasciculus, mammillothalamic fasciculus, thalamomammillary fasciculus, bundle of Vicq d'Azyr) is an efferent pathway of the mammillary bodies which project to the anterior nuclei of the thalamus. The mammillothalamic tract is part of the Papez circuit (involved in spatial memory), starting and finishing in the hippocampus. The fibers of the MMT are heavily myelinated.

It arises from the medial and lateral nuclei of the mammillary bodies, and from fibers that are directly continued from the fornix of the hippocampus. It connects the mammillary bodies to the dorsal tegmental nuclei, the ventral tegmental nuclei, and the anterior thalamic nuclei.

== Structure ==
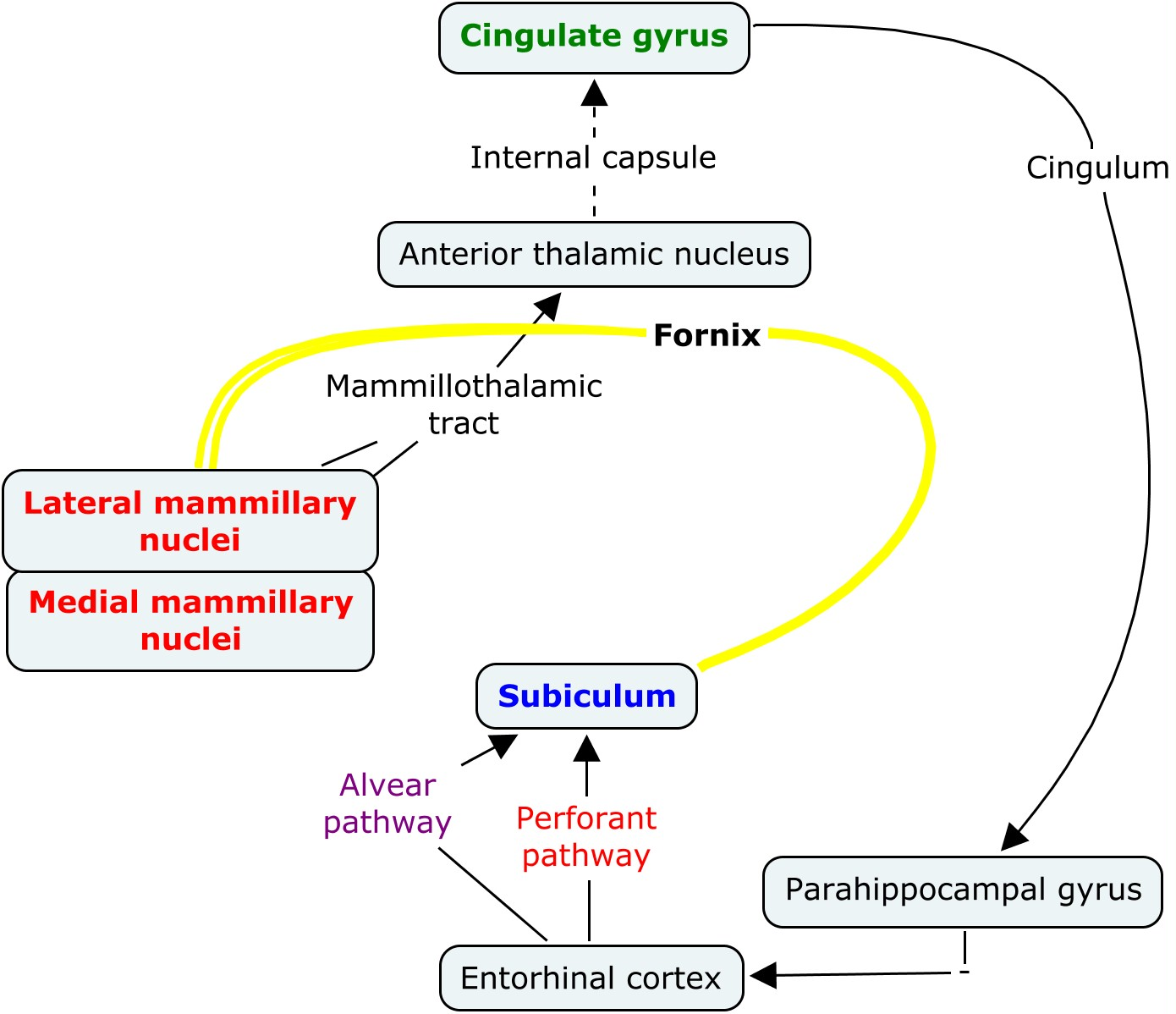
Mammillothalamic tract in the Papez circuit

Axons divide within the gray matter; the thicker fibres form the MTT while the finer branches descend as the mammillotegmental fasciculus. The MTT spreads fan-like as it terminates in the medial dorsal nucleus. The axons from these nuclei form part of the thalamocortical radiations.

== Function ==
The mammillary bodies directly or indirectly connect to the amygdala, hippocampus, and thalami as major structures in the limbic system. The mammillothalamic tract carries signals from the mammillary bodies via the anterior thalamus to support spatial memory.

== Clinical significance ==
Infarction of the region including the mammillothalamic tract has been associated with acute Korsakoff syndrome.

== History ==
The mammillothalamic tract was first described by the French physician, Félix Vicq d'Azyr, from whom it takes its alternate name (bundle of Vicq d'Azyr).

== See also ==
- Hypothalamotegmental tract
