= Paul D. MacLean =

American physician and neuroscientist

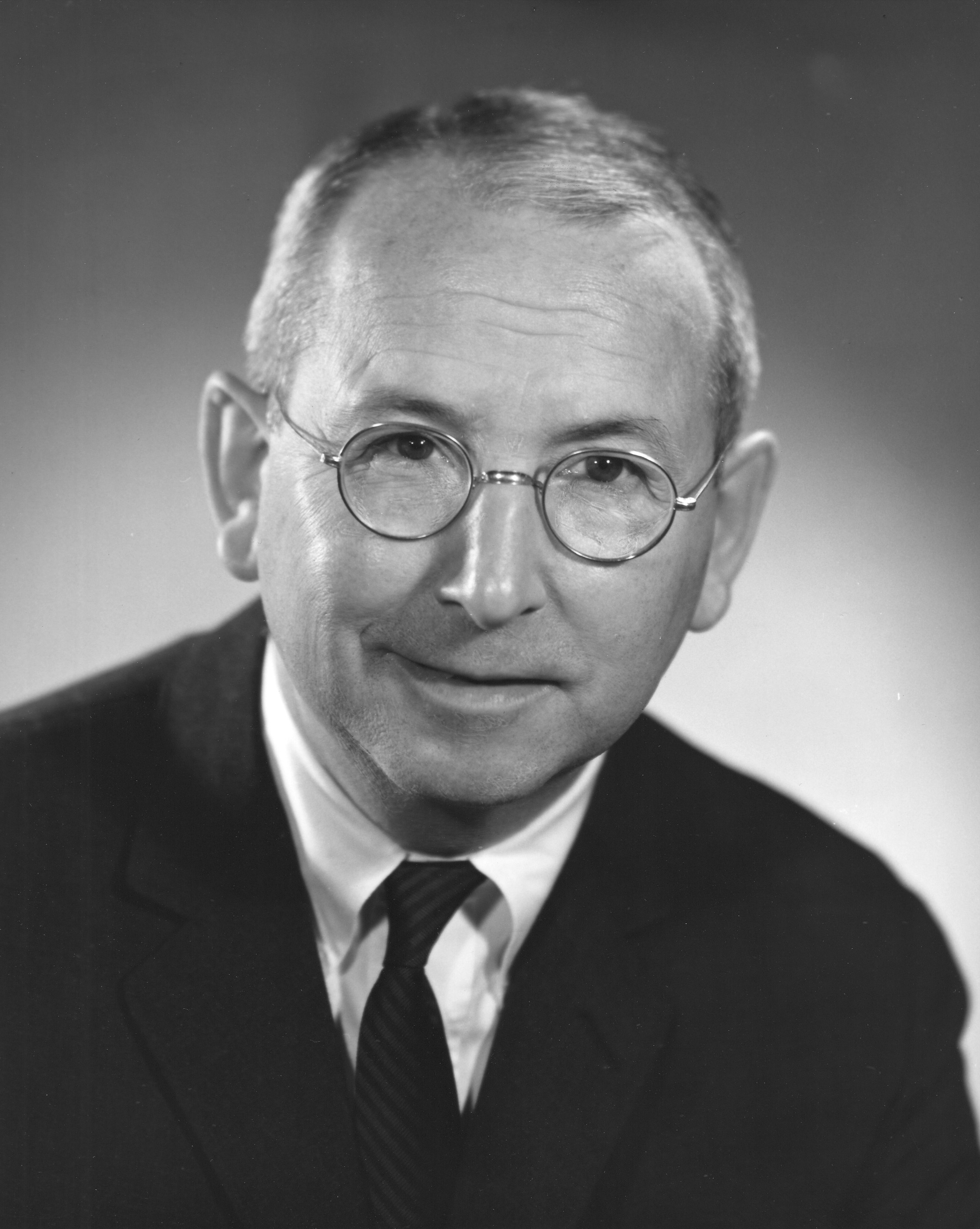
- Born: Paul Donald MacLean; May 1, 1913; Phelps, New York, US
- Died: December 26, 2007 (aged 94); Potomac, Maryland, US
- Education: Yale University
- Known for: The triune brain theory
- Spouse: Alison Stokes (m. 2006, died)
- Scientific career
- Fields: Neuroscience
- Workplaces: Yale Medical School (1949–1956); University of Zurich(1956–1957); National Institute of Mental Health (1957–1985)
- Military career
- Branch: United States Army
- Units: 39th General Hospital Brigade
- Conflicts: World War II

Paul Donald MacLean (May 1, 1913 – December 26, 2007) was an American physician and neuroscientist who made significant contributions in the fields of physiology, psychiatry, and brain research through his work at Yale Medical School and the National Institute of Mental Health. MacLean's evolutionary triune brain theory proposed that the human brain was in reality three brains in one: the reptilian complex, the limbic system, and the neocortex.

== Early life and education ==
Paul D. MacLean was born in Phelps, New York, the third of four sons of a Presbyterian minister. He received his bachelor's degree in English from Yale University in 1935 and intended to study philosophy at the University of Edinburgh, but after a family illness, spent a year completing pre-medical work in Edinburgh instead. MacLean received his medical degree from Yale in 1940.

== Work ==
During World War II, MacLean served as a medical officer in the United States Army from 1942 to 1946. During his service with Yale's 39th General Hospital Brigade in New Zealand, MacLean worked together with Dr. Averill Liebow to show that the diphtheria bacillus was a cause of tropical ulcers, paving the way for successful prophylaxis and treatment.

After leaving the Army in 1946, MacLean practiced medicine in Seattle, and held a clinical appointment at the University of Washington Medical School. From 1947 to 1949, MacLean was a United States Public Health Service Fellow at Harvard Medical School/Massachusetts General Hospital, studying with Dr. Stanley Cobb. During this time, MacLean did research on psychomotor epilepsy, and published his paper on the "visceral brain", for which he introduced the term "limbic system" in 1952).

In 1949, MacLean joined the faculty of the Yale Medical School with a joint appointment in physiology and psychiatry. During his time at Yale, he also studied the brain mechanisms of emotion with Dr. John Fulton. It was during this period that MacLean began to define his theory of the triune brain which would become the foundation of his research throughout his career.

In 1956, MacLean became associate professor of physiology. He spent a year on a National Science Foundation Senior Postdoctoral Fellowship at the Institute of Physiology in Zürich, Switzerland.

In 1957, MacLean went to the National Institutes of Health as the head of a new section on the limbic system in the Laboratory of Neurophysiology, National Institute of Mental Health (NIMH). MacLean received the Distinguished Research Award of the Association for Research in Nervous and Mental Disease in 1964, and in 1966 gave the Thomas William Salmon Lectures at the New York Academy of Medicine. MacLean also received the G. Burroughs Mider Lectureship Award from the NIH in 1972.

In 1971 MacLean became the Chief of the Laboratory of Brain Evolution and Behavior, NIMH, newly opened in Poolesville, Maryland. MacLean was chief of the Laboratory of Brain Evolution and Behavior from 1971 to 1985. The laboratory was designed for comparative neurobehavioral research on animals in semi-natural conditions. MacLean retired with the NIH honor of senior research scientist, emeritus in the Department of Neurophysiology at NIMH.

MacLean's ideas were popular among popular authors such as Carl Sagan and Arthur Koestler.

Correspondence, photographs, research materials, reports, writings, and audiovisual materials (1936; 1944–1993) held by the National Library of Medicine document the official portion of MacLean's career in brain and behavioral research.

== Death ==
He died in Potomac, Maryland, on December 26, 2007.

== See also ==
- Comparative Neuroscience at Wikiversity

== Sources ==
- Pearce, Jeremy (January 10, 2008). "Paul MacLean, 94, Neuroscientist Who Devised 'Triune Brain' Theory, Dies". The New York Times.
