= Reticulotegmental nucleus =

Details

Identifiers
- Latin: nucleus reticularis tegmenti pontis
- NeuroNames: 568
- TA98: A14.1.05.506; A14.1.05.211
- TA2: 5952
- FMA: 72471

The reticulotegmental nucleus, tegmental pontine reticular nucleus (or pontine reticular nucleus of the tegmentum) is an area within the floor of the pons, in the brain stem. This area is known to affect the cerebellum with its axonal projections.

These afferent connections have been proven to project not only ipsilaterally, but also to decussate and project to the contralateral side of the vermis.

It has also been shown that the projections from the pontine tegmentum to the cerebellar lobes are only crossed fibers.

The reticulotegmental nucleus also receives efferent axons from the cerebellum.

This nucleus is known for its large number of multipolar cells and its particularly reticular structure.

The reticulotegmental nucleus is topographically related to pontine nuclei (non-reticular), being just dorsal to them.

The reticulotegmental nucleus has been known to mediate eye movements, otherwise known as saccadic movement. This makes sense concerning their connections, as it would require a nucleus that receives and projects to the cerebellum to mediate that kind of complex circuitry. Furthermore, in terms of behavior, one does not think about saccadic movements when scanning a room, as the saccadic movements are not directly controlled by the cortex.

The pontine nuclei are the most traditionally studied mostly because it is easy to see which nuclei degrade when the cerebellum is amputated.

The neurons of the lateral reticular formation are very important for reflexes and the mediation of posture. It has been shown in cats that electrical stimulation of the reticular formation can make a standing cat lie down. Also, stimulation of the cat in an alternative spot can make a lying cat stand.
