= Superior vestibular nucleus =

Neuron cluster of the medulla

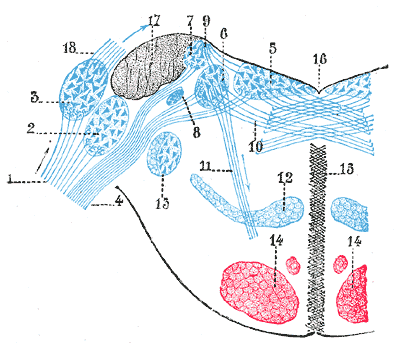
- Terminal nuclei of the vestibular nerve, with their upper connections. (#7 is Nucleus of Bechterew.) View of medulla.

Details

Identifiers
- Latin: nucleus vestibularis superior
- NeuroNames: 715
- NeuroLex ID: nlx_144001
- TA98: A14.1.05.429
- TA2: 5934
- FMA: 54617

The superior vestibular nucleus (Bechterew's nucleus) is the dorso-lateral part of the vestibular nucleus and receives collaterals and terminals from the ascending branches of the vestibular nerve.

Sends uncrossed fibers to cranial nerve 3 and 4 via the medial longitudinal fasciculus (MLF)
