= Vestibular nerve =

Branch of the vestibulocochlear nerve

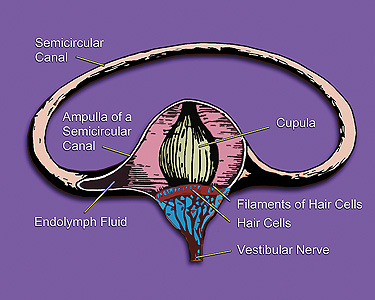
- Inner ear illustration showing semicircular canal, hair cells, ampulla, cupula, vestibular nerve, & fluid

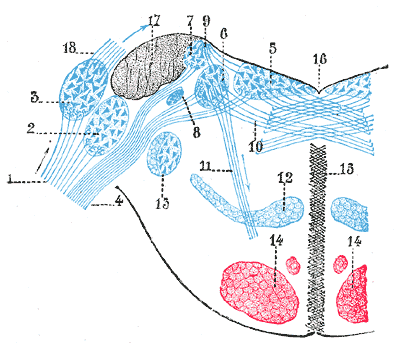
- Terminal nuclei of the vestibular nerve, with their upper connections. (Schematic.): 1. Cochlear nerve, with its two nuclei 2. Accessory nucleus 3. Tuberculum acusticum 4. Vestibular nerve 5. Internal nucleus 6. Nucleus of Deiters; 7. Nucleus of Bechterew; 8. Inferior or descending root of acoustic 9. Ascending cerebellar fibers 10. Fibers going to raphé 11. Fibers taking an oblique course 12. Lemniscus; 13. Inferior sensory root of trigeminal 14. Cerebrospinal fasciculus 15. Raphé; 16. Fourth ventricle 17. Inferior peduncle. Origin of striæ medullares.

Details
- From: Vestibulocochlear nerve

Identifiers
- Latin: nervus vestibularis
- MeSH: D014725
- TA98: A14.2.01.122
- TA2: 6308
- FMA: 53401

The vestibular nerve is one of the two branches of the vestibulocochlear nerve (the cochlear nerve being the other). In humans the vestibular nerve transmits sensory information from vestibular hair cells located in the two otolith organs (the utricle and the saccule) and the three semicircular canals via the vestibular ganglion of Scarpa. Information from the otolith organs reflects gravity and linear accelerations of the head. Information from the semicircular canals reflects rotational movement of the head. Both are necessary for the sensation of body position and gaze stability in relation to a moving environment.

Axons of the vestibular nerve synapse in the vestibular nucleus are found on the lateral floor and wall of the fourth ventricle in the pons and medulla.

It arises from bipolar cells in the vestibular ganglion which is situated in the upper part of the outer end of the internal auditory meatus.

== Structure ==
The peripheral fibers divide into three branches (some sources list two):

- the superior branch passes through the foramina in the area vestibularis superior and ends in the utricle and in the osseous ampullae of the superior and lateral semicircular ducts;
- the fibers of the inferior branch traverse the foramina in the area vestibularis inferior and end in the saccule;
- the posterior branch runs through the foramen singulare and supplies the ampulla of the posterior semicircular duct.

== Function ==
The primary role of the vestibular nerve is to transmit information about balance of the head in relation to the body. The vestibular nerve dynamically updates the frame of reference of motor movement based on the orientation of the head in relation to the body. As an example, when standing upright and facing forward, if you wished to tilt your head to the right you would need to perform a slight leftward motor movement (shifting more of your weight to your left side) to maintain balance. While the head is still in motion, the response magnitude of alteration to motor coordinates is significantly reduced when compared to when the head is fixated in one position.

== Clinical significance ==
=== Damage ===
Due to its role in transforming motor coordinates, the vestibular nerve implicitly plays a role in maintaining stable blood pressure during movement, maintaining balance control, spatial memory and spatial navigation. The most common causes of damage to the vestibular nerve are exposure to ototoxic antibiotics, Ménière's disease, encephalitis and some rare autoimmune disorders. Typically, patients with a damaged nerve suffer from acute attacks of vertigo accompanied by nausea/vomiting, inability to maintain posture and horizontal nystagmus.

=== Rehabilitation ===
Rapid compensation to damage of the vestibular nerve occurs within seven to ten days of receiving the damage. A small percentage of patients with damage to the vestibular nerve experience recurrent symptoms. These patients have not been able to undergo vestibular compensation and are left with long-term attacks of vertigo. By administering betahistine to the damaged nerve over a long period of time, the process of vestibular compensation can be accelerated to alleviate symptoms. Patients can also learn strategies to recover their balance through physical therapy.

== See also ==
- Vestibular system

== Additional images ==
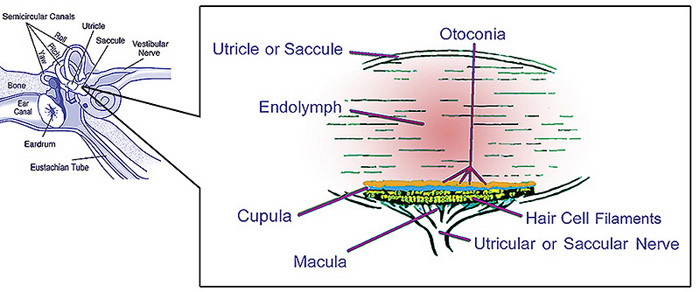
Illustration of otolith organs
