= Dorsal tegmental nucleus =

The dorsal tegmental nucleus (DTN), also known as dorsal tegmental nucleus of Gudden, is a group of neurons located in the brainstem, which are involved in spatial navigation and orientation.

== Anatomy ==
The dorsal tegmental nucleus is located in the brain stem near the midline. Two nuclei exist in both hemispheres. The DTN is generally subdivided into four parts called partes centralis, ventromedialis, anterior, and posterior.

DTN contains a dense population of GABAergic cells. In the rat, few also express calbindin (CB) or calretinin (CR). Many of the DTN GABAergic cells do express parvalbumin (PV) with the densest expression in the pars ventralis portion. DTN neurons in rats contain small number of neuropeptide Y positive (NPY) neurons implicating a role in hunger and feeding. In rats, the DTN contains a small number of enkephalin, substance p, and glutamatergic neurons which project to mammillary.

=== Circuitry ===
As part of the Papez circuit, the DTN receives input from habenula neurons and lateral mammillary neurons. DTN especially the central part of the DTN receives projections from the G-protein coupled receptor GPR151 containing habenula neurons.

The pars centralis of the DTN receives input from the prepositus hypoglossi and the supragenualis nucleus. Pars ventromedialis of the DTN receives inputs from

- the septal nuclei,
- diagonal band of Broca,
- preoptic area,
- anterior and lateral hypothalamus,
- lateral and medial habenular nuclei,
- medial mammillary nucleus and
- brainstem reticular formation

=== Projections ===
Dorsal tegmental fibres project to

- lateral mammillary neurons (LMN)
- dorsal noradrenergic bundle
- nuclei medialis profundus
- centralis superior,
- the tegmental reticular nucleus,
- the ventral tegmental area of Tsai, and
- the posterior hypothalamic nucleus. The nucleus is a major synaptic station for the pathways of the dorsal longitudinal fasciculus between the diencephalon and lower brain stem

DTN is a major source of fibers in the mammillary peduncle. Rostral DTN cells that project to the LMN are localized within pars dorsalis and caudal cells that project to the LMN are located in the pars ventralis.

== Function ==
This nucleus is involved in landmark and directional navigation. Subpopulations of DTN neurons respond differently to changes in angular head velocity (AHV) and head direction (HD). Some cells respond to changes in head movement in specific directions such as to the left, right, or both. The firing activity of these cells are also affected by the speed of the movement of the head as well. DTN lesions permanently impaired landmark navigation, but only transiently impaired directional navigation.
