= Inferior cerebellar peduncle =

Structure in the human brain

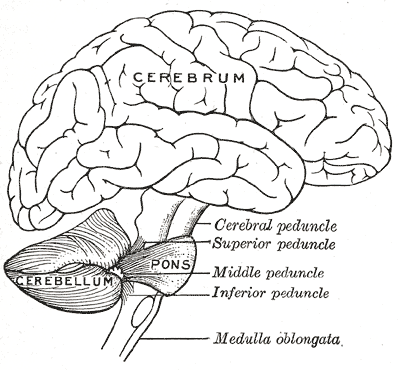
- Scheme showing the connections of the several parts of the brain. (Inferior peduncle labeled at bottom right.)

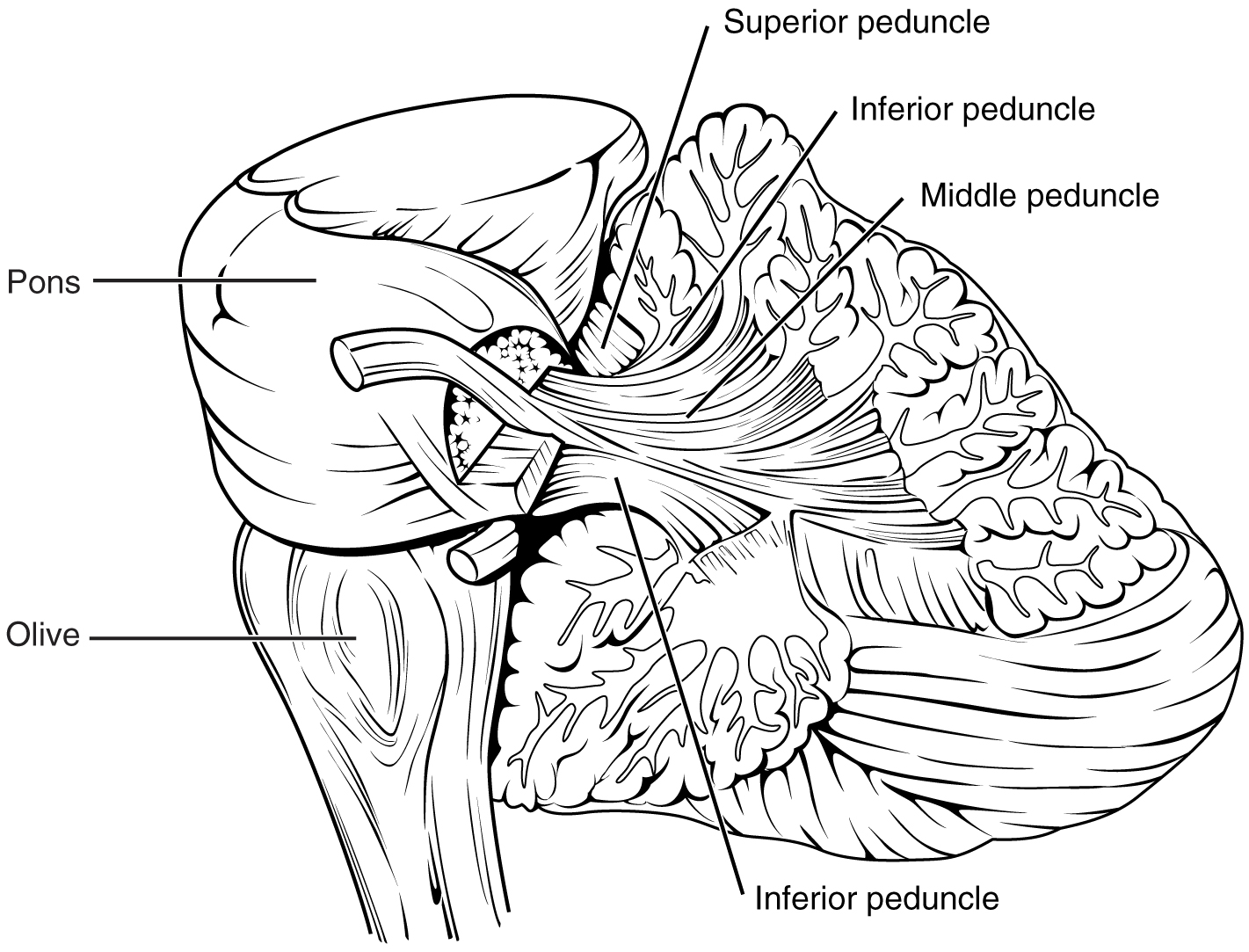
- Inferior cerebellar peduncle shown with the two other cerebellar peduncles

Details

Identifiers
- Latin: pedunculus cerebellaris inferior
- NeuroNames: 781
- NeuroLex ID: birnlex_1691
- TA98: A14.1.04.013; A14.1.07.413
- TA2: 5850
- FMA: 72615

The inferior cerebellar peduncle is formed by fibers of the restiform body that join with fibers from the much smaller juxtarestiform body. The inferior cerebellar peduncle is the smallest of the three cerebellar peduncles.

The upper part of the posterior district of the medulla oblongata is occupied by the inferior cerebellar peduncle, a thick rope-like strand situated between the lower part of the fourth ventricle and the roots of the glossopharyngeal and vagus nerves.

Each inferior cerebellar peduncle connects the spinal cord and medulla oblongata with the cerebellum, and comprises the juxtarestiform body and restiform body.

Important fibers running through the inferior cerebellar peduncle include the dorsal spinocerebellar tract and axons from the inferior olivary nucleus, among others.

== Function ==
The inferior cerebellar peduncle carries many types of input and output fibers that are mainly concerned with integrating proprioceptive sensory input with motor vestibular functions such as balance and posture maintenance. It consists of fibers from the four spinocerebellar tracts that enter the cerebellum:

- Posterior spinocerebellar tract: unconscious proprioceptive information from the lower part of trunk and lower limb. This tract originates at the ipsilateral Clarke's nucleus (T1-L1) and travels upward to reach the inferior cerebellar peduncle and synapses within the spinocerebellum (also known as the paleocerebellum).
- Cuneocerebellar tract: unconscious proprioceptive information from the upper limb and neck. This tract originates at the ipsilateral accessory cuneate nucleus and travels through the inferior cerebellar peduncle to reach the spinocerebellum part of the cerebellum.
- Trigeminocerebellar tract: unconscious proprioceptive information from the face.
- Olivocerebellar tract: "error signal" in movement originates from the cerebral cortex and spinal cord. This tract originates at contralateral inferior olivary nucleus and enters the cerebellum as a climbing fiber.
- Vestibulocerebellar tract: vestibular information projects onto the vestibulocerebellum (also known as the archicerebellum).

This peduncle also carries information leaving cerebellum: from the Purkinje cells to the vestibular nuclei in the dorsal brainstem located at the junction between the pons and medulla oblongata.

== See also ==
- Cerebral peduncle
- Juxtarestiform body
- Middle cerebellar peduncle
- Superior cerebellar peduncle

== Additional images ==
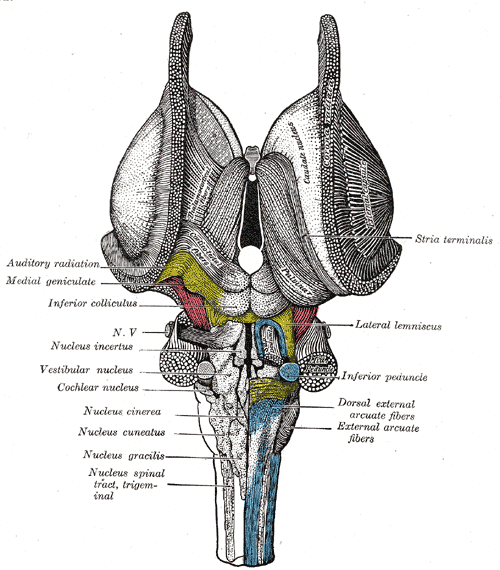
Dissection of brain-stem. Dorsal view.

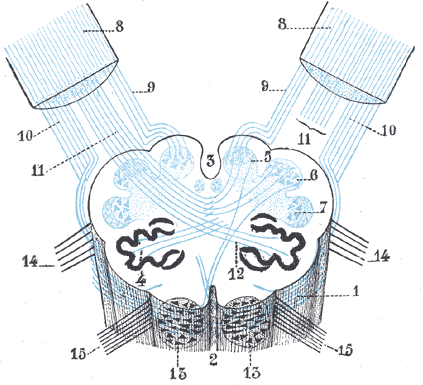
Diagram showing the course of the arcuate fibers.

Cross section of lower pons showing part of the inferior cerebellar peduncle (#8) labeled at the upper left.

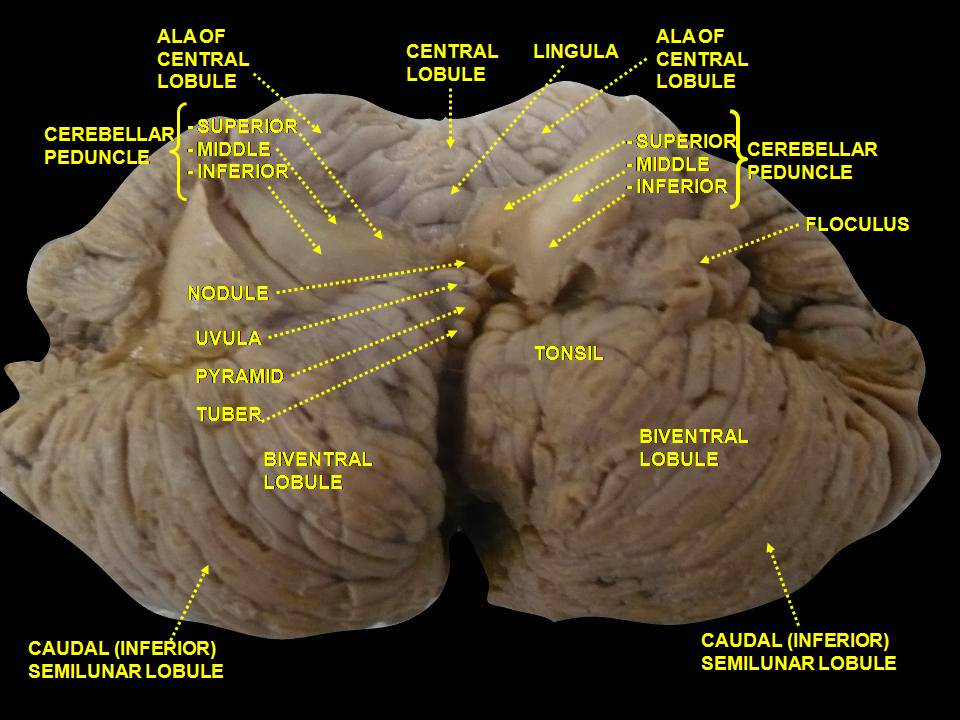
Cerebellum. Inferior surface.
