= Arbor vitae (anatomy) =

White matter of the cerebellum

- Figure shows cerebellum and surrounding regions; sagittal view of one hemisphere. A: Midbrain. B: Pons. C: Medulla. D: Spinal cord. E: Fourth ventricle. F: Arbor vitae. G: Flocculus. H: Tonsil. I: Posterior lobe. J: Anterior lobe. K: Inferior colliculus. L: Superior colliculus.

- Animation of the left half of the human brain. Arbor vitae is illustrated in white.

Details

Identifiers
- Latin: arbor vitae cerebelli
- NeuroNames: 692
- NeuroLex ID: nlx_anat_20090101
- TA98: A14.1.07.401
- TA2: 5789
- FMA: 72541

The arbor vitae /ˌɑːrbɔːr ˈvaɪtiː/ (Latin for "tree of life") is the cerebellar white matter, so called for its branched, tree-like appearance. In some ways it more closely resembles a fern, and is present in both cerebellar hemispheres. The pattern is most apparent on a midsagittal section of the cerebellum.

The arbor vitae forms the central white-matter core of the cerebellum and serves as a conduit for pathways that carry sensory and motor information to and from the cerebellar cortex. It is continuous with the cerebellar white-matter tracts entering and leaving the cerebellum through the cerebellar peduncles.

Within the arbor vitae, the deep cerebellar nuclei: the dentate, globose, emboliform and the fastigial nuclei are situated. These nuclei give rise to the major output (efferent projections) of the cerebellum to other parts of the nervous system.

== Additional images ==
Dissection video (1 min 14 s). Describing the arbor vitae.

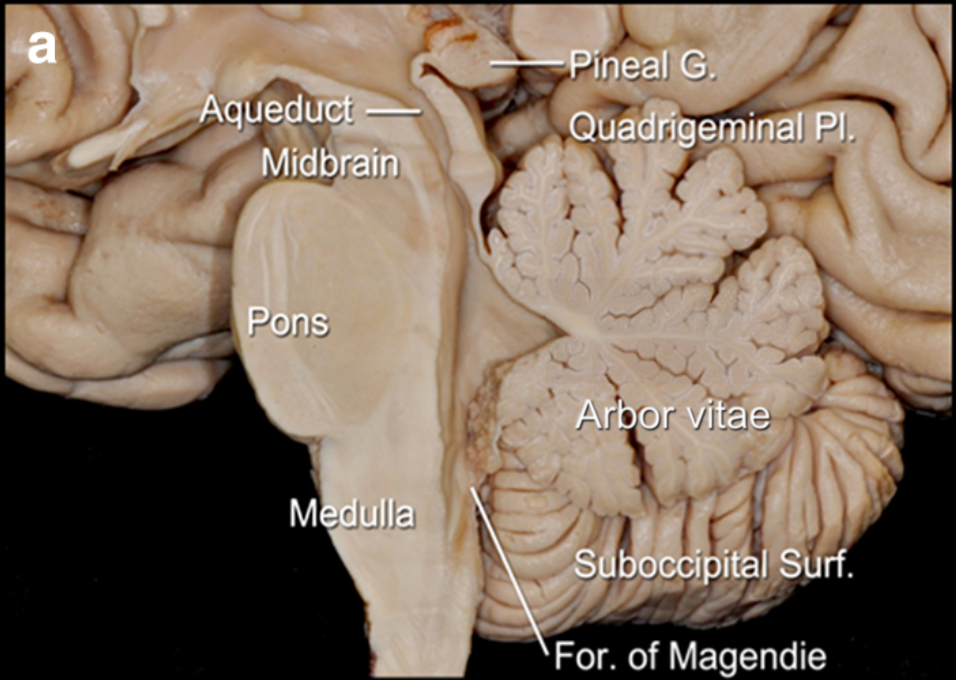
Midsagittal section of the brainstem.

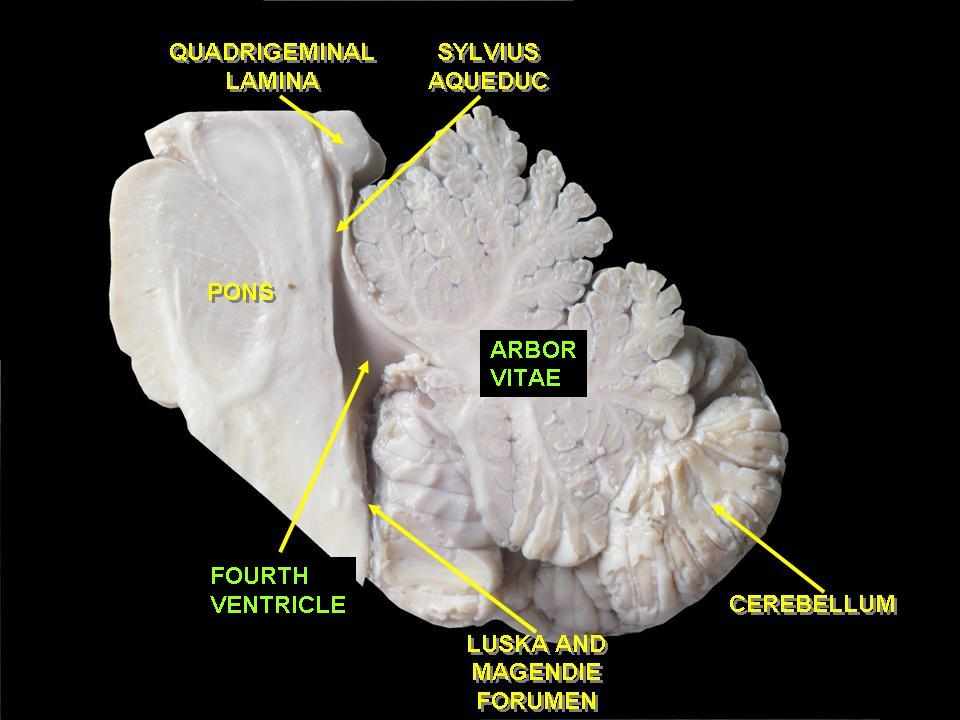
Midsagittal section of the brainstem. Arbor vitae labelled at the center.

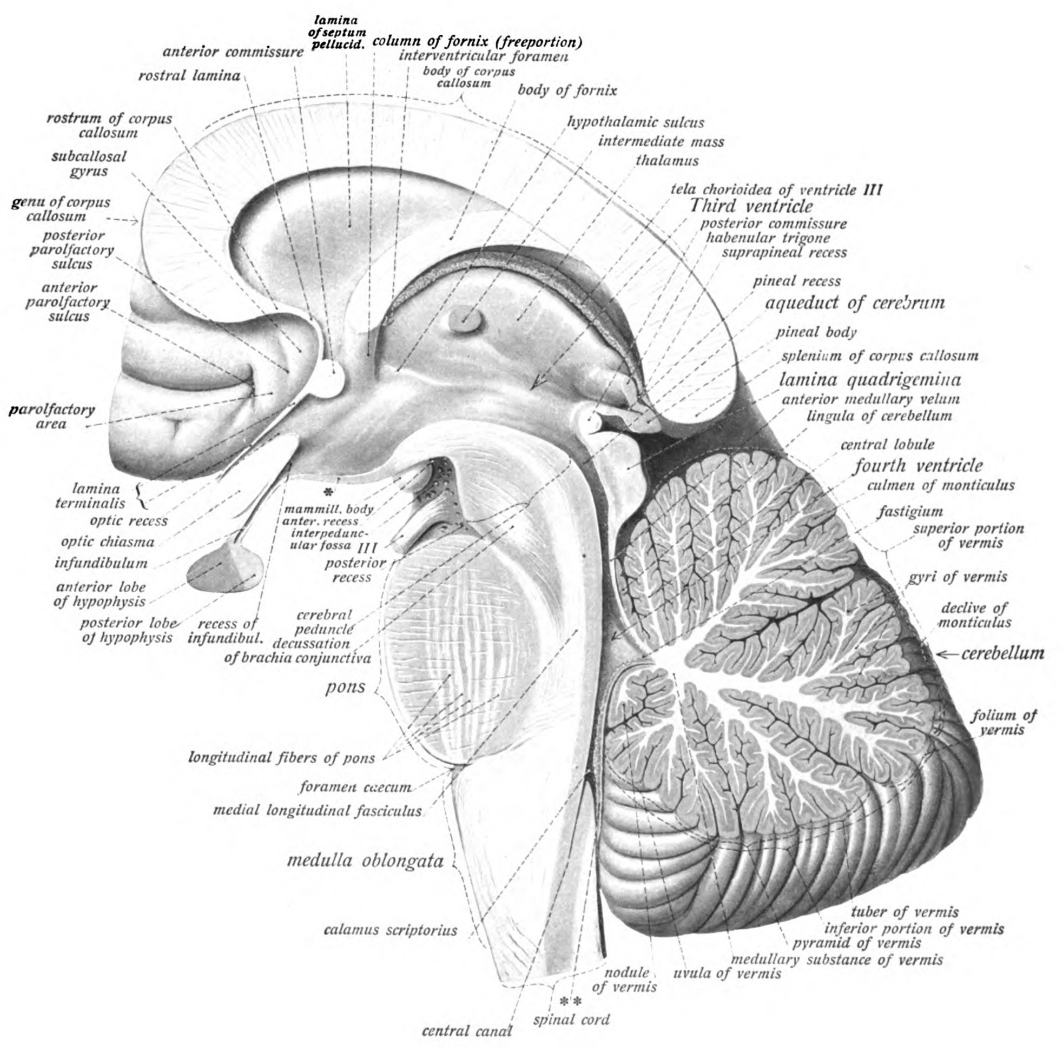
Midsagittal section of the brainstem.

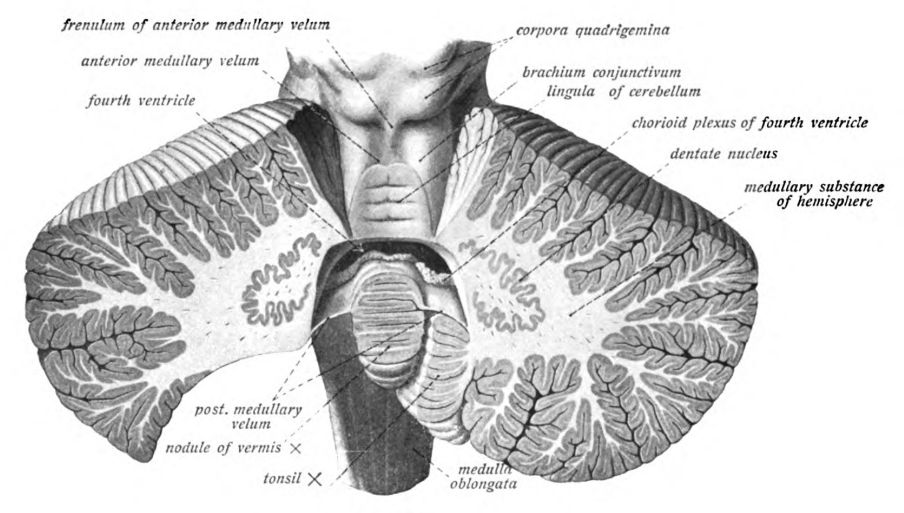
Coronal section of the cerebellum.

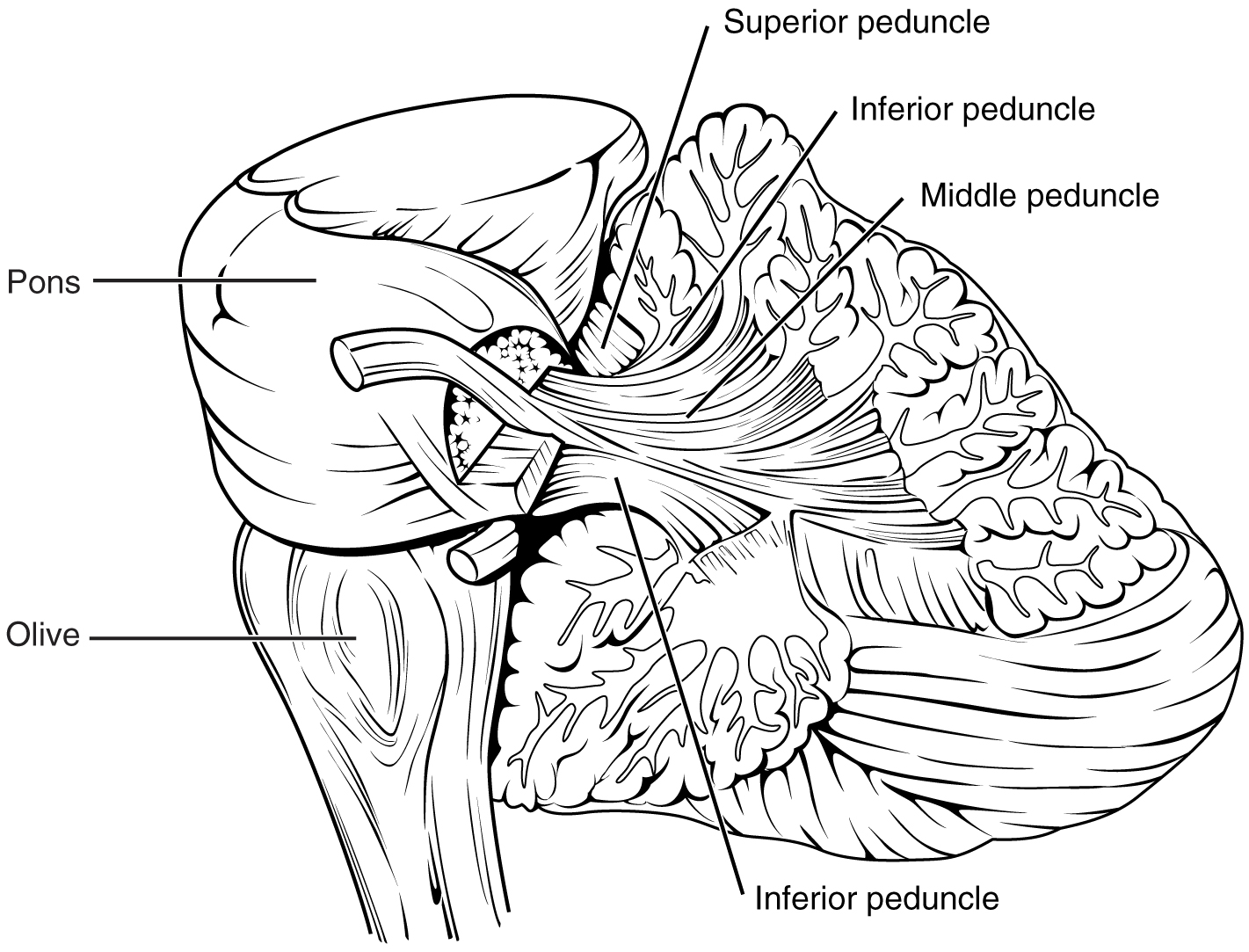
Arbor vitae and cerebellar peduncles.
