= Nucleus (neuroanatomy) =

Cluster of neurons in the central nervous system

In neuroanatomy, a nucleus (pl.: nuclei) is a cluster of neurons in the central nervous system, located deep within the cerebral hemispheres, brainstem and cerebellum. The neurons in one nucleus usually have roughly similar connections and functions. Nuclei are connected to other nuclei by tracts, the bundles (fascicles) of axons (nerve fibers) extending from the cell bodies. A nucleus is one of the two most common forms of nerve cell organization, the other being layered structures such as the cerebral cortex or cerebellar cortex. In anatomical sections, a nucleus shows up as a region of gray matter, often bordered by white matter. The vertebrate brain contains hundreds of distinguishable nuclei, varying widely in shape and size. A nucleus may itself have a complex internal structure, with multiple types of neurons arranged in clumps (subnuclei) or layers.

The term "nucleus" is in some cases used rather loosely, to mean simply an identifiably distinct group of neurons, even if they are spread over an extended area. The reticular nucleus of the thalamus, for example, is a thin layer of inhibitory neurons that surrounds the thalamus.

Some of the major anatomical components of the brain are organized as clusters of interconnected nuclei. Notable among these are the thalamus and hypothalamus, each of which contains several dozen distinguishable substructures. The medulla and pons also contain numerous small nuclei with a wide variety of sensory, motor, and regulatory functions.

In the peripheral nervous system (PNS), a cluster of cell bodies of neurons (homologous to a CNS nucleus) is called a ganglion. The fascicles of nerve fibers in the PNS (homologous to CNS tracts) are called nerves.

== Examples ==
- Brainstem: red nucleus, vestibular nucleus, inferior olive
- Cerebellum: dentate nucleus, emboliform nucleus, globose nucleus, fastigial nucleus
- Basal ganglia: striatum (caudate and putamen), pallidum (globus pallidus, medial and lateral), substantia nigra, subthalamic nucleus
- Cranial nerve nuclei
- Ventromedial nucleus of the hypothalamus: "The ventromedial hypothalamus (VMH) is a distinct morphological nucleus involved in feeding, fear, thermoregulation, and sexual activity."

== See also ==
- List of regions in the human brain
- Brain
- Nervous system
- List of nerves of the human body
