= Cerebellar vermis =

Structure connecting the two cerebellar hemispheres

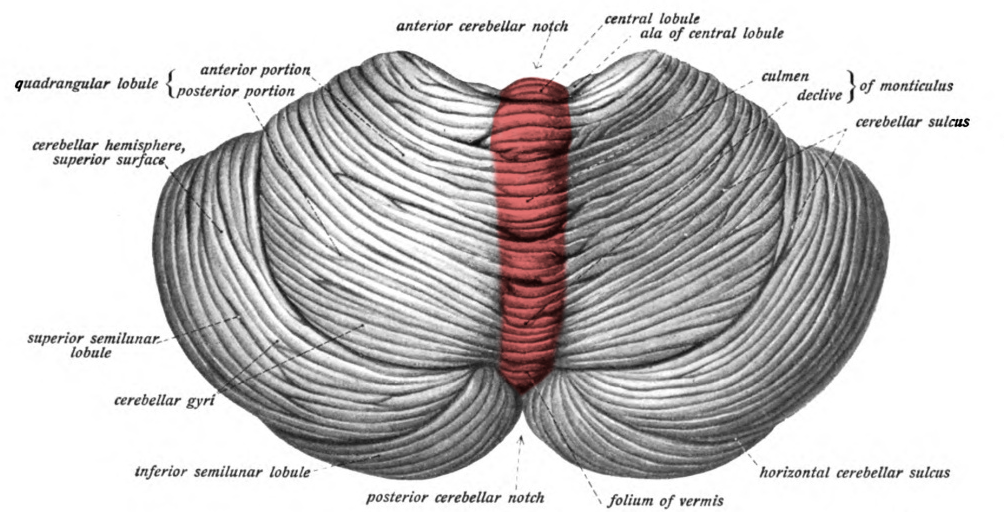
- Upper surface of cerebellum. The vermis is highlighted in red.

- Vermis (highlighted in red) on the cerebellum.

Details
- Part of: Cerebellum

Identifiers
- Latin: vermis cerebelli
- MeSH: D065814
- NeuroNames: 2463
- NeuroLex ID: birnlex_1106
- TA98: A14.1.07.006
- TA2: 5819
- FMA: 76928

The cerebellar vermis (from Latin vermis, "worm") is located in the medial, cortico-nuclear zone of the cerebellum, which is in the posterior fossa of the cranium. The primary fissure in the vermis curves ventrolaterally to the superior surface of the cerebellum, dividing it into anterior and posterior lobes. Functionally, the vermis is associated with bodily posture and locomotion. The vermis is included within the spinocerebellum and receives somatic sensory input from the head and proximal body parts via ascending spinal pathways.

The cerebellum develops in a rostro-caudal manner, with rostral regions in the midline giving rise to the vermis, and caudal regions developing into the cerebellar hemispheres. By 4 months of prenatal development, the vermis becomes fully foliated, while development of the hemispheres lags by 30–60 days. Postnatally, proliferation and organization of the cellular components of the cerebellum continues, with completion of the foliation pattern by 7 months of life and final migration, proliferation, and arborization of cerebellar neurons by 20 months.

Inspection of the posterior fossa is a common feature of prenatal ultrasound and is used primarily to determine whether excess fluid or malformations of the cerebellum exist. Anomalies of the cerebellar vermis are diagnosed in this manner and include phenotypes consistent with Dandy–Walker malformation, rhombencephalosynapsis, displaying no vermis with fusion of the cerebellar hemispheres, pontocerebellar hypoplasia, or stunted growth of the cerebellum, and neoplasms. In neonates, hypoxic injury to the cerebellum is fairly common, resulting in neuronal loss and gliosis. Symptoms of these disorders range from mild loss of fine motor control to severe intellectual disability and death. Karyotyping has shown that most pathologies associated with the vermis are inherited through an autosomal recessive pattern, with most known mutations occurring on the X chromosome.

The vermis is intimately associated with all regions of the cerebellar cortex, which can be divided into three functional parts, each having distinct connections with the brain and spinal cord. These regions are the vestibulocerebellum, which is responsible primarily for the control of eye movements; the spinocerebellum, involved in fine tune body and limb movement; and the cerebrocerebellum, which is associated with planning, initiation and timing of movements.

== Structure ==
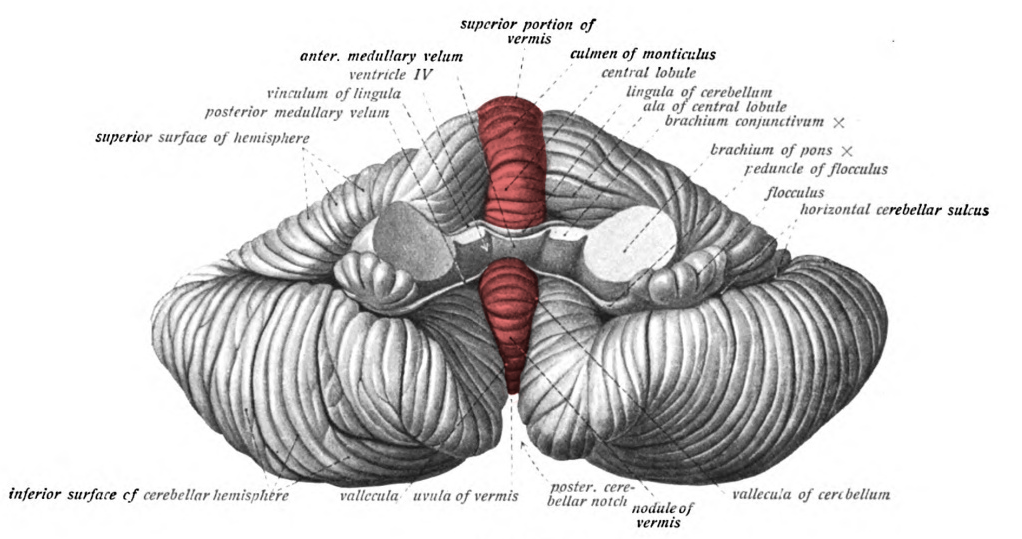
Anterior surface of cerebellum. The vermis is highlighted in red.

The vermis is the unpaired, median portion of the cerebellum that connects the two hemispheres. Both the vermis and the hemispheres are composed of lobules formed by groups of folia. There are nine lobules of the vermis: lingula, central lobule, culmen, clivus, folium of the vermis, tuber, pyramid, uvula and nodule. These lobules are often difficult to observe during human anatomy classes and may vary in size, shape and number of folia. It has been shown that folia of the cerebellum exhibit frequent variations in form, number and arrangement between individuals.

=== Lobe anatomy ===
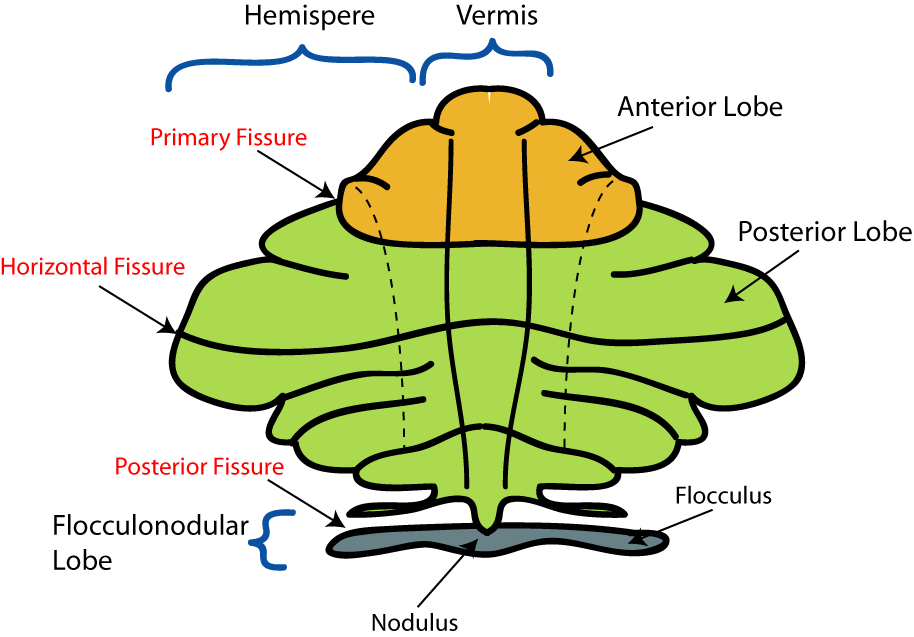
Schematic representation of the major anatomical subdivisions of the cerebellum.

The lingula is the first lobule of the upper portion of the vermis on the superoinferior axis and pertains to the paleocerebellum together with the central lobule, culmen, pyramid and uvula. It is separated from the central lobule by the pre-central fissure. The central lobule is the second lobule of the upper portion of the vermis on the superoinferior axis. The culmen is the third and largest lobule of the upper portion of the vermis on the superoinferior axis. It is separated from the declive by the primary fissure and is related with the anterior quadrangular lobule of the hemisphere. The culmen and the anterior parts of the quadrangular lobules form the lobus culminis; the clivus and the posterior parts form the lobus clivi. The pyramid is the seventh lobule of the vermis on the superoinferior axis. It is separated from the tuber and uvula by the pre-pyramidal and secondary fissures, respectively. This lobule is related with the biventral lobule of the hemisphere. The uvula is the second largest lobule, following the culmen. It pertains to the paleocerebellum and is separated from the nodule by the posterolateral fissure.

=== Spinocerebellum ===
The spinocerebellum receives proprioception input from the dorsal columns of the spinal cord (including the spinocerebellar tract) and from the trigeminal nerve, as well as from visual and auditory systems. It sends fibers to deep cerebellar nuclei that, in turn, project to both the cerebral cortex and the brain stem, thus providing modulation of descending motor systems. This region comprises the vermis and intermediate parts of the cerebellar hemispheres. Sensory information from the periphery and from the primary motor and somatosensory cortex terminate in this region. Purkinje cells of the vermis project to the fastigial nucleus, controlling the axial and proximal musculature involved in the execution of limb movements. Purkinje cells in the intermediate zone of the spinocerebellum project to the interposed nuclei, which control the distal musculature components of the descending motor pathways needed for limb movement. Both of these nuclei include projections to the motor cortex in the cerebrum.

==== Nuclei ====
The interposed nucleus is smaller than the dentate nucleus but larger than the fastigial nucleus and functions to modulate muscle stretch reflexes of distal musculature. It is located dorsal to the fourth ventricle and lateral to the fastigial nucleus; it receives afferent neuronal supply from the anterior lobe of the cerebellum and sends output via the superior cerebellar peduncle and the red nucleus.

The fastigial nucleus is the most medial efferent cerebellar nucleus, targeting the pontine and medullary reticular formation as well as the vestibular nuclei. This region deals with antigravity muscle groups and other synergies involved with standing and walking. It is thought that fastigial nuclei axons are excitatory and project beyond the cerebellum, likely using glutamate and aspartate as neurotransmitters.

== Pathology ==
Malformations of the posterior fossa have been recognized more frequently during the past few decades as the result of recent advances in technology. Malformations of the cerebellar vermis were first identified using pneumoencephalography, where air is injected into the cerebrospinal fluid spaces of the cerebellum; displaced, occluded or dysplastic structures could be identified. Upon the advent of computerized tomography (CT) and magnetic resonance imaging (MRI), the resolution of cranial structures including the mid-hindbrain regions improved dramatically.

=== Joubert syndrome ===
Joubert syndrome (JS) is one of the most commonly diagnosed syndromes associated with the molar tooth sign (MTS), or hypoplasia/dysplasia of the cerebellar vermis accompanied by brainstem abnormalities. JS is defined clinically by features of hypotonia in infancy with later development of ataxia, developmental delays, mental retardation, abnormal breathing patterns, abnormal eye movements specific to oculomotor apraxia, or the presence of the MTS on the cranial MRI. JS is an autosomal recessive condition with an estimated prevalence of 1: 100,000.

=== Dandy Walker malformation ===
Dandy Walker malformation is a relatively common congenital brain malformation with a prevalence of 1:30,000 live births. Dandy Walker malformation is characterized by enlarged posterior fossa and in which the cerebellar vermis is completely absent, or present in a rudimentary form, sometimes rotated accompanied by an elevation of the fourth ventricle. It is also commonly associated with dysplasias of brainstem nuclei. DWM has been reported to be in association with a wide array of chromosomal anomalies, including trisomy 18, trisomy 9, and trisomy 13. Surveys suggest that prenatal exposure to teratogens such as rubella or alcohol are correlated with development of Dandy Walker malformation.

=== Rhombencephalosynapsis ===
Rhombencephalosynapsis is an anomaly characterized by the absence or severe dysgenesis of the cerebellar vermis with fusion of the cerebellar hemispheres, peduncles, and dentate nuclei. Diagnostic features include fusion of the midbrain colliculi, hydrocephalus, absence of the corpus callosum other midline structural brain malformations.

=== Autism spectrum disorders ===
Hypoplasia and other structural alterations of the vermis have been identified in many patients with autism spectrum disorder (ASD). While the exact nature and extent of the impacts ASD has on the vermis remain in question, it has also been shown that other injuries and malformations of the vermis sometimes produce symptoms closely analogous to ASD. Furthermore, several genetic syndromes known to cause autism (such as fragile X syndrome) have also been shown to cause damage to the vermis.

=== Damage ===
Lesions to the vermis commonly give rise to clinical depression, inappropriate emotional displays (e.g. unwarranted giggling) in addition to movement disorders.

== Comparative anatomy ==
Early neurophysiologists suggest that retinal and inertial signals were selected for about 450 million years ago by primitive brainstem-cerebellar circuitry because of their relationship with the environment. Microscopically, it is evident that Purkinje cell precursors arose from granule cells, first forming in irregular patterns, then progressively becoming organized in a layered fashion. Evolutionarily, the Purkinje cells then developed extensive dendritic trees that increasingly became confined to a single plane, through which the axons of granule cells threaded, eventually forming a neuronal grid of right angles. The origin of the cerebellum is in close association with that of the nuclei of the vestibular cranial nerve and lateral line nerves, perhaps suggesting that this part of the cerebellum originated as a means of carrying out transformations of the coordinate system from input data of the vestibular organ and the lateral line organs. This suggests that the function of the cerebellum evolved as a mode of computing and representing an image relating to the position of the body in space. The cerebellar vermis evolved in conjunction with the hemispheres; this is seen in lampreys and higher vertebrates.

=== In fish ===
In vertebrates, the cerebellar vermis develops between two bilaterally symmetrical formations located dorsal to the upper end of the medulla oblongata, or rhombencephalon. This is the region of termination for the fibers of the vestibular nerve and lateral line nerves; thus, these are the oldest afferent paths to the cerebellum and cerebellar vermis. In bony fish, or teleosts, it has been proposed that the cerebellar auricles, which receive a large amount of input from the vestibulolateral line system, constitute the vestibulocerebellum and are homologues of the flocculonodular lobe of higher vertebrates along with the corpus cerebelli, which receives spinocerebellar and tectocerebellar fibers. The labyrinth and the lateral line organs of lampreys have structural and functional similarity. An important difference between the two structures is that the arrangement of the lateral line organs are such that they are sensitive to relative motion of the fluid surrounding the animal, whereas the labyrinths, having very similar sensing mechanisms, are sensitive to endolymph, providing information concerning the animal's own equilibrium of the body and orientation in space.

== See also ==
- cerebellar vermis hypoplasia, a genetic ciliopathy
- Anatomy of the cerebellum

== Additional images ==
Dissection video. Explains the position of vermis.

Animation. Vermis is highlighted in red.

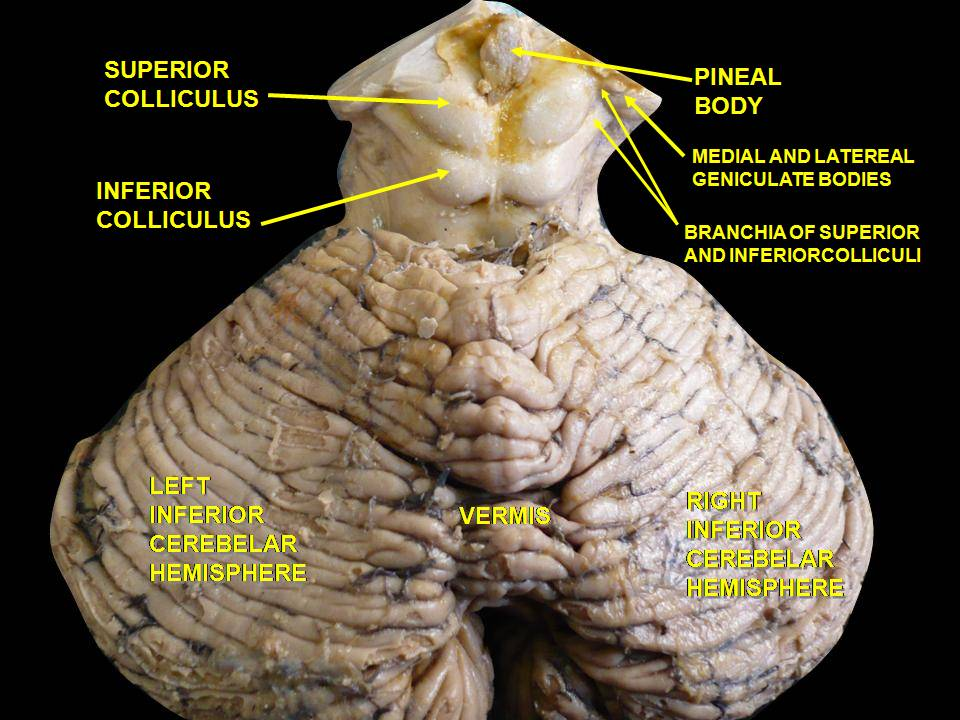
Brainstem. Posterior view.

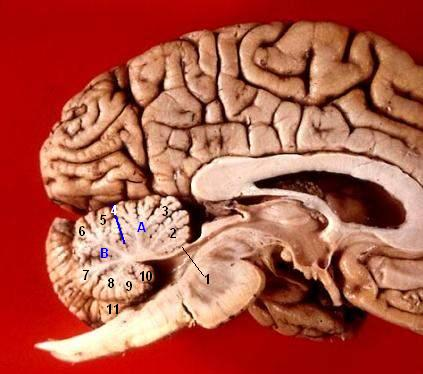
Midsagittal view

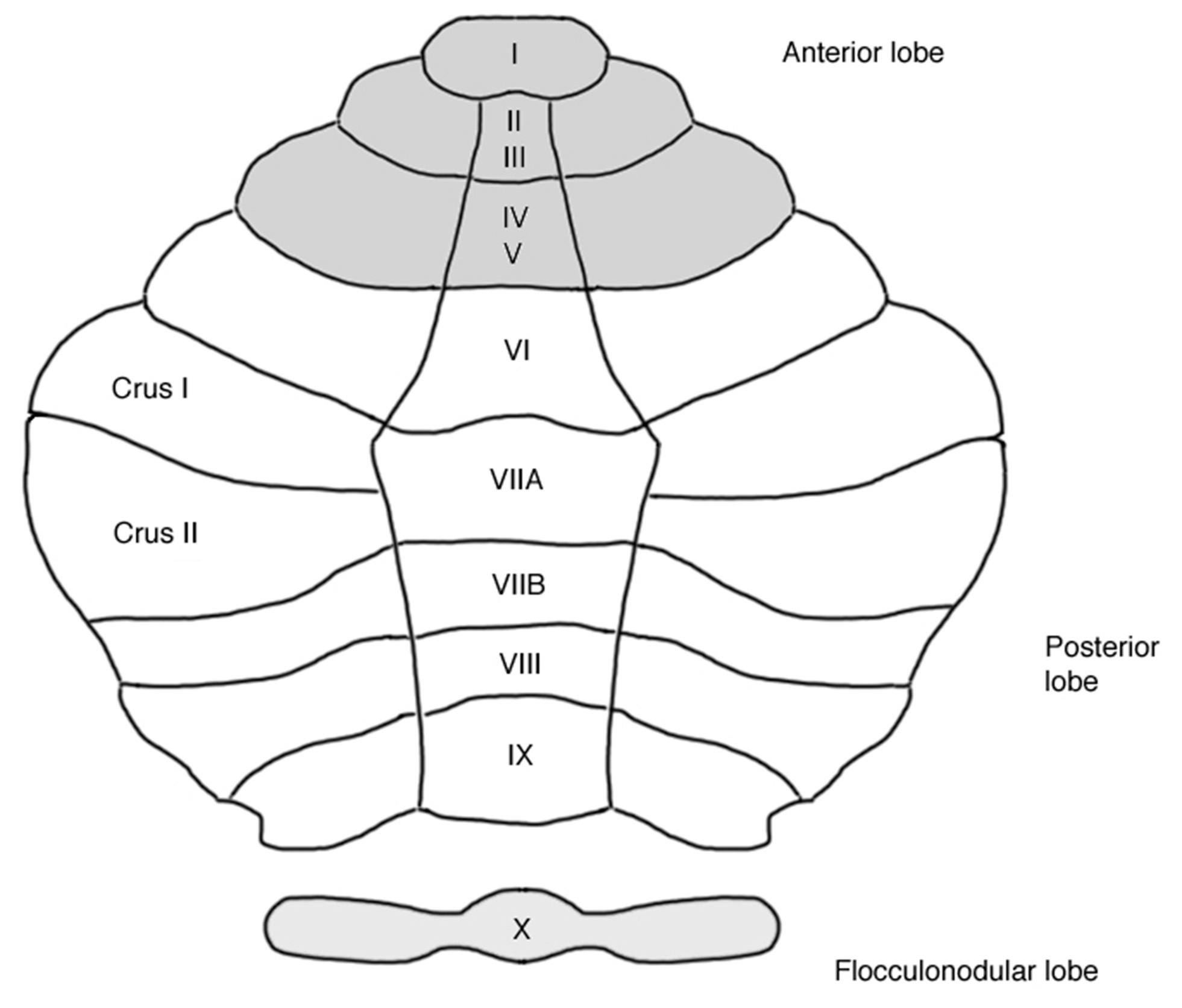
Lobules of the vermis.
