= Grey matter =

Areas of neuronal cell bodies in the brain

- The formation of the spinal nerve from the dorsal and ventral roots (with grey matter labelled at centre right).

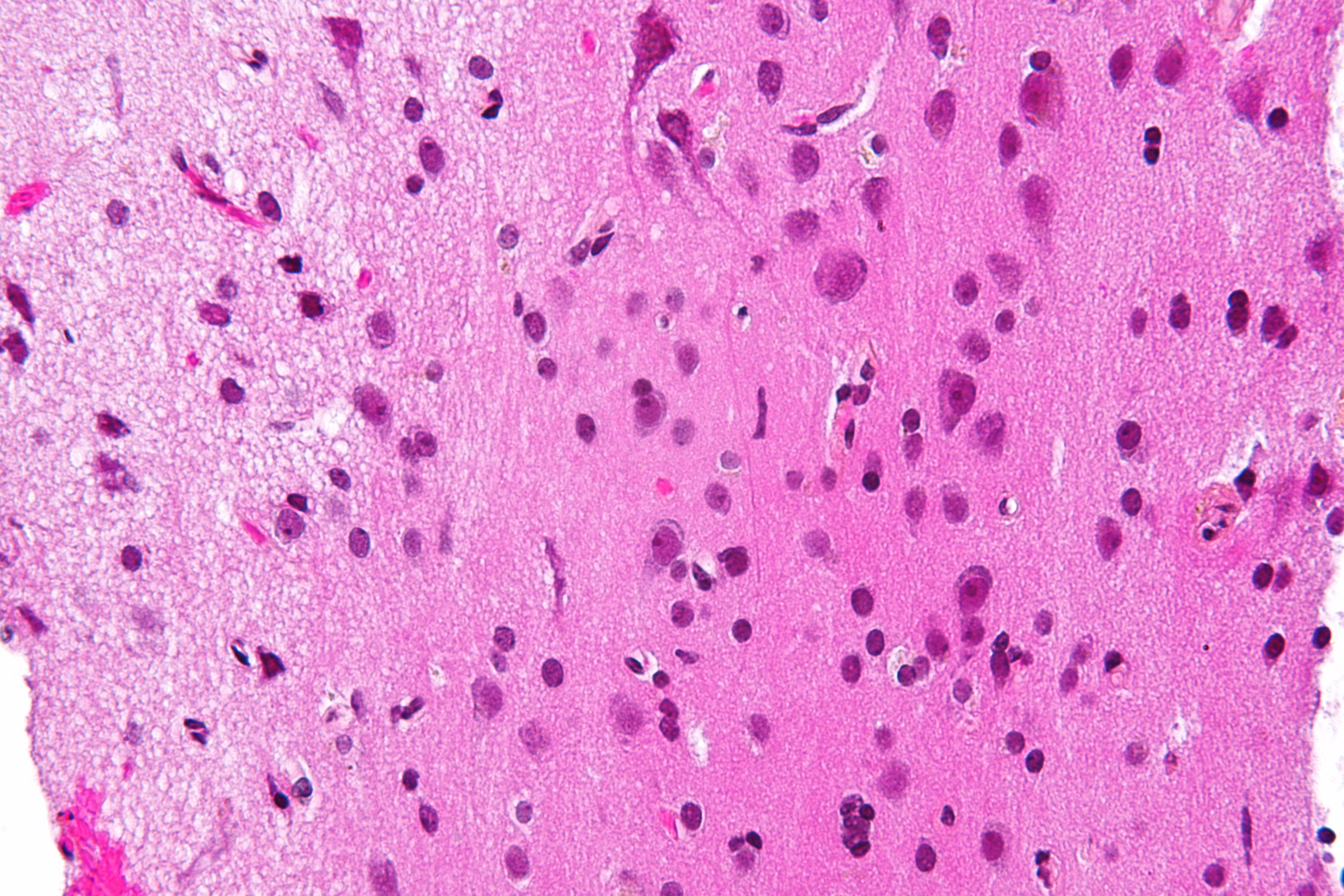
- Micrograph showing grey matter, with the characteristic neuronal cell bodies (dark shade of pink), and white matter with its characteristic fine meshwork-like appearance (left of image; lighter shade of pink). HPS stain.

Details

Identifiers
- Latin: substantia grisea
- MeSH: D066128
- TA98: A14.1.00.002; A14.1.02.020; A14.1.04.201; A14.1.05.201; A14.1.05.401; A14.1.06.301
- TA2: 5365
- FMA: 67242

Grey matter (gray matter in American English) forms the dark outer layer of the brain. Grey matter is the part of the brain that interprets and processes information, whereas white matter transmits that information. In the spinal cord, the white matter is the outer layer instead.

It consists of neuronal cell bodies, neuropil (dendrites and unmyelinated axons), glial cells (astrocytes and oligodendrocytes), synapses, and capillaries. Grey matter is distinguished from white matter in that it contains numerous cell bodies and relatively few myelinated axons, while white matter contains relatively few cell bodies and is composed chiefly of long-range myelinated axons. The colour difference arises mainly from the whiteness of myelin. In living tissue, grey matter actually has a very light grey colour with yellowish or pinkish hues, which come from capillary blood vessels and neuronal cell bodies.

== Structure ==
Grey matter refers to unmyelinated neurons and other cells of the central nervous system. It is present in the brain, brainstem and cerebellum, and present throughout the spinal cord.

Grey matter is distributed at the surface of the cerebral hemispheres (cerebral cortex) and of the cerebellum (cerebellar cortex), as well as in the depths of the cerebrum (the thalamus; hypothalamus; subthalamus, basal ganglia – putamen, globus pallidus and nucleus accumbens; as well as the septal nuclei), cerebellum (deep cerebellar nuclei – the dentate nuclei, globose nucleus, emboliform nucleus, and fastigial nucleus), and brainstem (the substantia nigra, red nucleus, olivary nuclei, and cranial nerve nuclei).

Grey matter in the spinal cord is known as the grey column which travels down the spinal cord distributed in three grey columns that are presented in an "H" shape. The forward-facing column is the anterior grey column, the rear-facing one is the posterior grey column and the interlinking one is the lateral grey column. The grey matter on the left and right side is connected by the grey commissure. The grey matter in the spinal cord consists of interneurons, as well as the cell bodies of projection neurons.

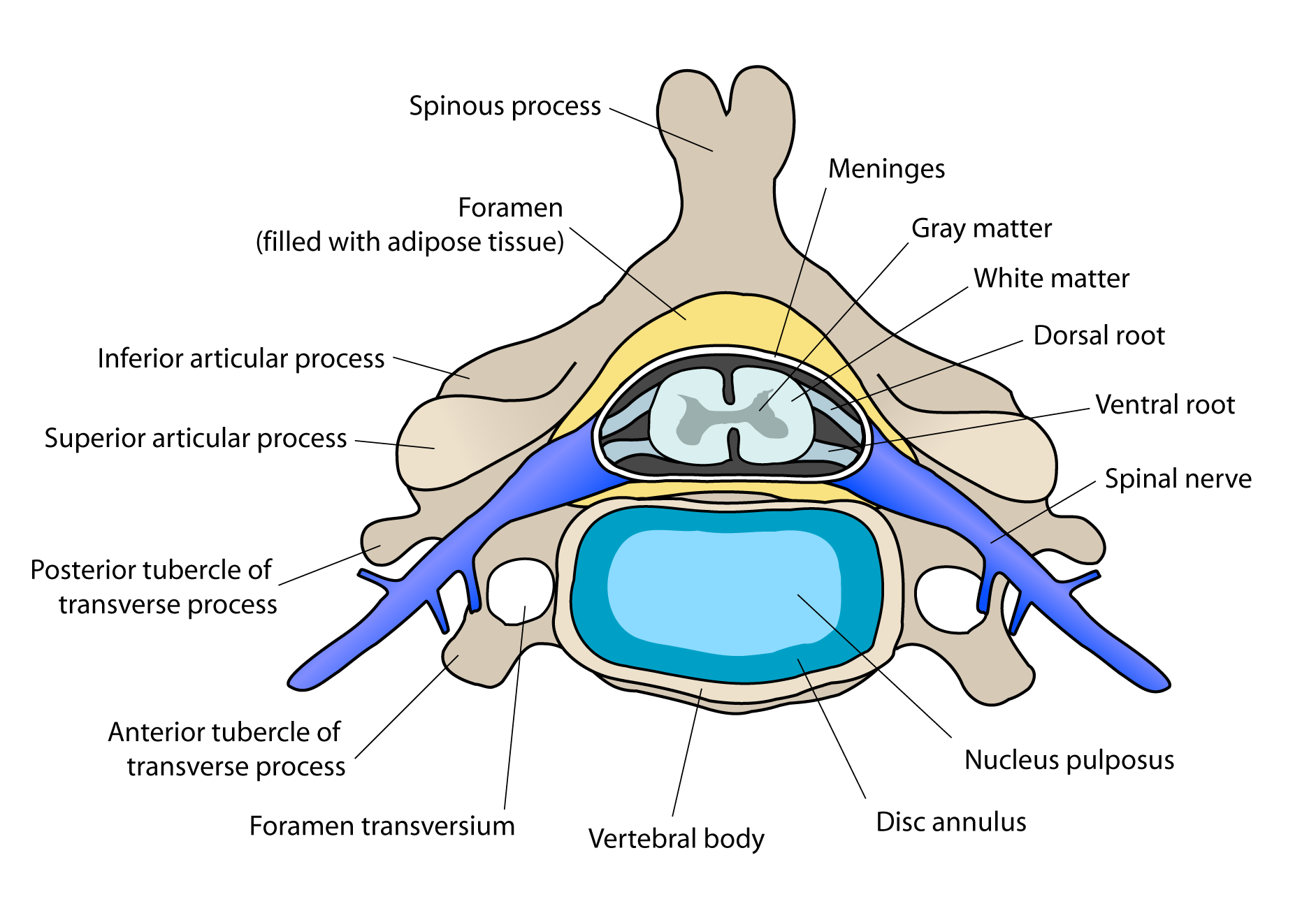
Cross-section of a spinal vertebra with the spinal cord in the centre (and grey matter labelled).

Cross-section of spinal cord with the grey matter labelled.

Grey matter undergoes development and growth throughout childhood and adolescence. Recent studies using cross-sectional neuroimaging have shown that by around the age of 8 the volume of grey matter begins to decrease. However, the density of grey matter appears to increase as a child develops into early adulthood. Males tend to exhibit grey matter of increased volume but lower density than that of females.

== Function ==
Grey matter contains most of the brain's neuronal cell bodies. The grey matter includes regions of the brain involved in muscle control, and sensory perception such as seeing and hearing, memory, emotions, speech, decision-making, and self-control.

The grey matter in the spinal cord is split into three grey columns:

- The anterior grey column contains motor neurons. These synapse with interneurons and the axons of cells that have travelled down the pyramidal tract. These cells are responsible for the movement of muscles.
- The posterior grey column contains the points where sensory neurons synapse. These receive sensory information from the body, including fine touch, proprioception, and vibration. This information is sent from receptors of the skin, bones, and joints through sensory neurons whose cell bodies lie in the dorsal root ganglion. This information is then transmitted in axons up the spinal cord in spinal tracts, including the dorsal column-medial lemniscus tract and the spinothalamic tract.
- The lateral grey column is the third column of the spinal cord.

The grey matter of the spinal cord can be divided into different layers, called Rexed laminae. These describe, in general, the purpose of the cells within the grey matter of the spinal cord at a particular location.

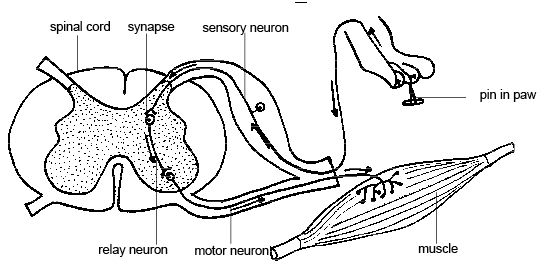
Interneurons present in the grey matter of the spinal cord

Rexed laminae groups the grey matter in the spinal cord according to its function.

== Changes to grey matter ==
High alcohol consumption has been correlated with significant reductions in grey matter volume. Short-term cannabis use (30 days) is not correlated with changes in white or grey matter. However, several cross-sectional studies have shown that repeated long-term cannabis use is associated with smaller grey matter volumes in the hippocampus, amygdala, medial temporal cortex, and prefrontal cortex, with increased grey matter volume in the cerebellum. Long-term cannabis use is also associated with alterations in white matter integrity in an age-dependent manner, with heavy cannabis use during adolescence and early adulthood associated with the greatest amount of change.

Meditation has been shown to change grey matter structure.

Habitual playing of first and third-person shooter action video games has been reported to promote a reduction of grey matter in the hippocampus while 3D platformer games have been reported to increase grey matter in the hippocampus.

Pregnancy renders substantial changes in brain structure, primarily reductions in grey matter volume in regions subserving social cognition. Grey matter reductions endure for at least 2 years post-pregnancy. The profile of brain changes is comparable to that taking place during adolescence, a hormonally similar transitional period of life.

== History ==
=== Etymology ===
In the current edition of the official Latin nomenclature, Terminologia Anatomica, substantia grisea is used for English grey matter. The adjective grisea for grey is however not attested in classical Latin. The adjective grisea is derived from the French word for grey, gris. Alternative designations like substantia cana and substantia cinerea are being used alternatively. The adjective cana, attested in classical Latin, can mean grey, or greyish white. The classical Latin cinerea means ash-coloured.

== Additional images ==
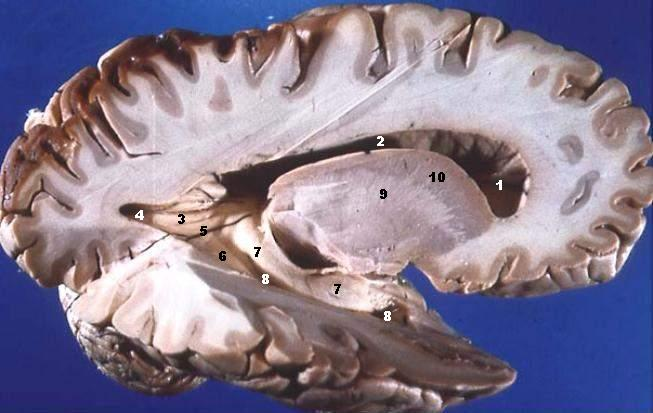
Human brain right dissected lateral view

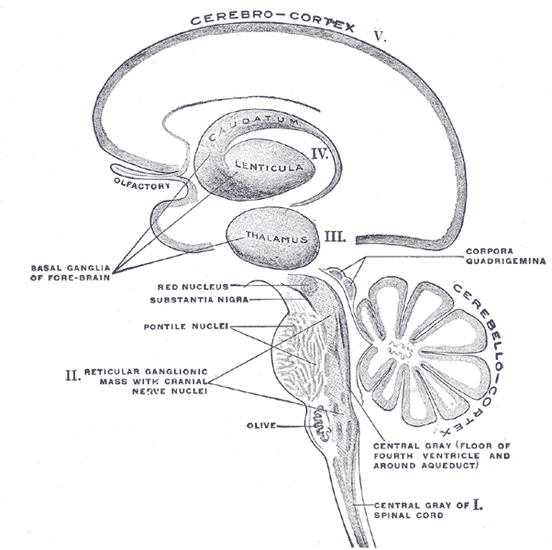
Schematic representation of the chief ganglionic categories (I to V).

== See also ==
- Grey matter heterotopia
