= Cortico-olivary fibers =

Details

Identifiers
- Latin: fibrae corticoolivares

The cortico-olivary fibers are axons of neurons projecting from the primary motor cortex, premotor cortex, and somatosensory cortex bilaterally to both inferior olivary nuclei as part of the cortico-olivocerebellar pathway. They follows the same course as the corticopontine fibers. The inferior olivary nuclei subsequently project to the contralateral (cerebro)cerebellum via the olivocerebellar fibers. This pathway constitutes one of the three main afferent pathways of the cerebellum (besides the spinocerebellar tract, and vestibulocerebellar tract).
