= Culmen =

A culmen is a top, a summit or a culminating point. It may also refer to:

- Culmen (bird), the upper ridge of a bird's beak
- Culmen (cerebellum), a structure in the brain
