= Deep cerebellar nuclei =

Nuclei located within the white matter of the cerebellum

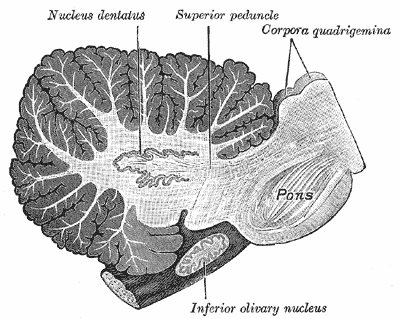
- Sagittal section through right cerebellar hemisphere. The right olive has also been cut sagittally. (Dentate nucleus labelled at top as nucleus dentatus)

- Microcircuitry of the cerebellum. Excitatory synapses are denoted by (+) and inhibitory synapses by (-). MF: Mossy fiber. DCN: Deep cerebellar nuclei. IO: Inferior olive. CF: Climbing fiber. GC: Granule cell. PF: Parallel fiber. PC: Purkinje cell. GgC: Golgi cell. SC: Stellate cell. BC: Basket cell.

Details
- Part of: Cerebellum
- Parts: Dentate nucleus, Emboliform nucleus, Fastigial nucleus, Globose nucleus
- Artery: Superior cerebellar

Identifiers
- Latin: nuclei cerebelli
- MeSH: D002529
- NeuroNames: 682
- NeuroLex ID: birnlex_1568
- TA98: A14.1.07.406
- TA2: 5835
- FMA: 72249

There are four paired deep cerebellar nuclei embedded in the white matter centre of the cerebellum. The nuclei are the fastigial, globose, emboliform, and dentate nuclei.

In lower mammals the emboliform nucleus appears to be continuous with the globose nucleus, and these are known together as the interposed nucleus.

== Inputs ==
These nuclei receive inhibitory (GABAergic) inputs from Purkinje cells in the cerebellar cortex and excitatory (glutamatergic) inputs from mossy fiber and climbing fiber pathways. Most output fibers of the cerebellum originate from these nuclei. One exception is that fibers from the flocculonodular lobe synapse directly on vestibular nuclei without first passing through the deep cerebellar nuclei. The vestibular nuclei in the brainstem are analogous structures to the deep nuclei, since they receive both mossy fiber and Purkinje cell inputs.

== Specific nuclei ==
From lateral to medial, the four deep cerebellar nuclei are the dentate, emboliform, globose, and fastigial. Some animals, including humans, do not have distinct emboliform and globose nuclei, instead having a single, fused interposed nucleus. In animals with distinct emboliform and globose nuclei, the term interposed nucleus is often used to refer collectively to these two nuclei.

== Topography ==
In general, each pair of deep nuclei is associated with a corresponding region of cerebellar surface anatomy.

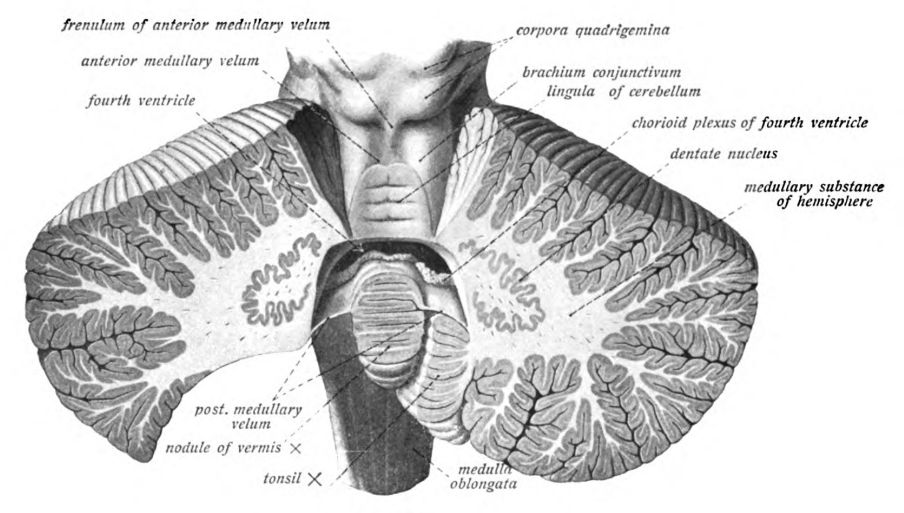
Cross-section of human cerebellum, showing the dentate nucleus, as well as fourth ventricle

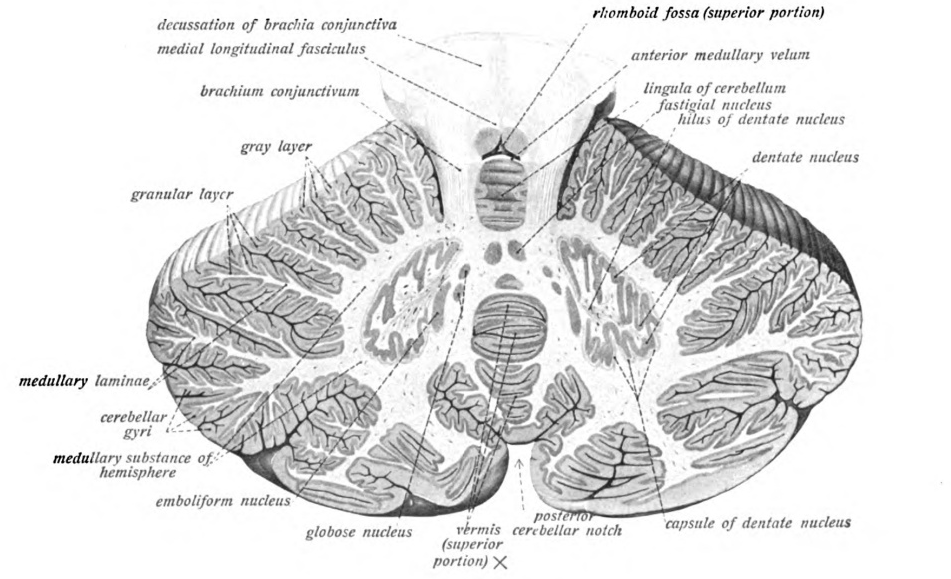
Cross-section of human cerebellum, showing the dentate nucleus and cross-section of vermis
- The dentate nuclei are deep within the lateral hemispheres,
- the interposed nuclei are located in the paravermal (intermediate) zone,
- and the fastigial nuclei are in the vermis.

These structural relationships are generally maintained in the neuronal connections between the nuclei and associated cerebellar cortex,

- with the dentate nucleus receiving most of its connections from the lateral hemispheres,
- the interposed nuclei receiving inputs mostly from the paravermis,
- and the fastigial nucleus receiving primarily afferents from the vermis.
