= Interposed nucleus =

Part of the human brain

Details

Identifiers
- Latin: nucleus interpositus anterior, nucleus interpositus posterior
- NeuroLex ID: nlx_anat_20081242

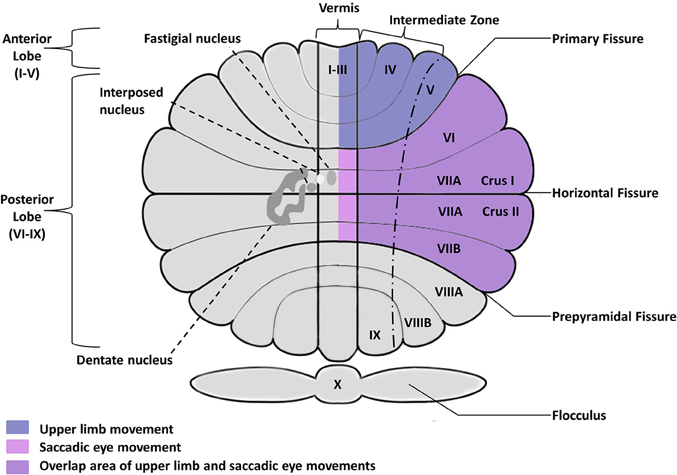
Posterior View of the Human Brain.

The interposed nucleus is the combined paired globose and emboliform nuclei, (deep cerebellar nuclei) on either side of the cerebellum. It is located in the roof of the fourth ventricle, lateral to the fastigial nucleus. The emboliform nucleus is the anterior interposed nucleus, and the globose nucleus is the posterior interposed nucleus.

The interposed nucleus is responsible for coordinating agonist/antagonist muscle pairs, and therefore a lesion in this area causes tremor.

== Anatomy ==
The interposed nucleus is located in the paravermis of the cerebellum.

The interposed nucleus is smaller than the dentate but larger than the fastigial nucleus.

=== Afferents ===
The interposed nuclei receives Purkine cell terminal afferents from the paravermal cortex of the spinocerebellum, as well as collaterals of cerebellar afferents from the restiform body and ventral spinocerebellar tract.

It receives input from the ipsilateral posterior external arcuate fibers (cuneocerebellar tract) and the dorsal spinocerebellar tract, which originate in the accessory cuneate nucleus and the posterior thoracic nucleus, respectively.

=== Efferents ===
Efferents from the interposed nuclei leave the cerebellum through superior cerebellar peduncle. They project to:

- contralateral (magnocellular division of) the red nucleus (→ rubrospinal tract). The red nucleus is the main target of the interposed nuclei.
- ipsilateral ventral lateral nucleus of thalamus (→ premotor cortex and primary motor cortex → lateral corticospinal tract).

The rubrospinal and lateral corticospinal tracts are subsequently involved in control of the distal musculature of the extremities.

== Function ==
The interposed nucleus modulates muscle stretch reflexes of proximal limb muscles, and is also required in delayed Pavlovian conditioning.
