= Convey =

Convey is a surname. Notable people with the surname include:

- Bobby Convey (born 1983), American soccer player
- Sylvia Convey (born 1948), Latvian Australian self-taught artist
- Eddie Convey (1909–1969), Canadian ice hockey left winger

== See also ==
- Bert Convy (1933–1991), American actor, singer, game-show host
