= Superior cerebellar peduncle =

Bundle of fibers in the human brain

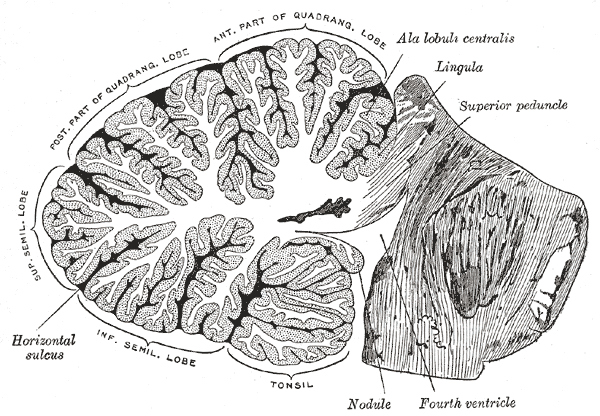
- Sagittal section of the cerebellum, near the junction of the vermis with the hemisphere. (Superior peduncle labeled at upper right.)

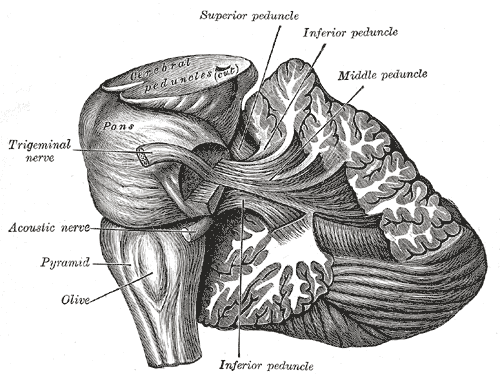
- Dissection showing the projection fibers of the cerebellum. (Superior peduncle labeled at center top.)

Details

Identifiers
- Latin: pedunculus cerebellaris superior
- NeuroNames: 833
- NeuroLex ID: birnlex_1711
- TA98: A14.1.05.006; A14.1.07.417; A14.1.08.678; A14.1.06.009; A14.1.06.216
- TA2: 5846
- FMA: 72495

In the human brain, the superior cerebellar peduncle (brachium conjunctivum) is one of the three paired cerebellar peduncles of bundled fibers that connect the cerebellum to the brainstem. The superior cerebellar peduncle connects to the midbrain. It consists mainly of efferent fibers, the cerebellothalamic tract that runs from a cerebellar hemisphere to the contralateral thalamus, and the cerebellorubral tract that runs from a cerebellar hemisphere to the red nucleus. It also contains afferent tracts, most prominent of which is the ventral spinocerebellar tract. Other afferent tracts are the ventral trigeminal tract, tectocerebellar fibers, and noradrenergic fibers from the locus coeruleus. The superior peduncle emerges from the upper and medial parts of the white matter of each cerebellar hemisphere and is placed under cover of the upper part of the cerebellum.

== Structure ==
Superior cerebellar peduncles are connected together by the superior medullary velum, which can be followed upward as far as the inferior colliculi, under which they disappear.

Below, they form the upper lateral boundaries of the fourth ventricle, but as they ascend they converge on the dorsal aspect of the ventricle and thus assist in forming its roof.

=== Decussation ===
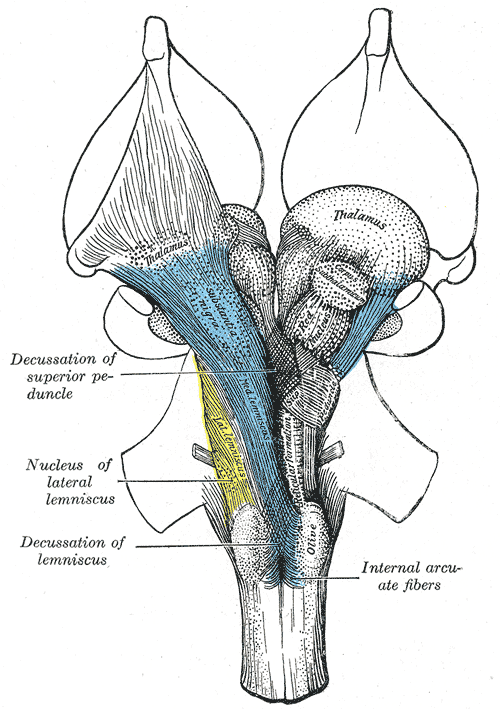
Deep dissection of brain-stem showing decussation

The decussation of superior cerebellar peduncle is the crossing of fibers of the superior cerebellar peduncle across the midline, and is located at the level of the inferior colliculi. It comprises the cerebellothalamic tract, which arises from the dentate nucleus (therefore also known as dentatothalamic tract), as well as the cerebellorubral tract, which arises from the globose and emboliform nuclei and project to the contralateral red nucleus to eventually become the rubrospinal tract. It is also known as horseshoe-shaped commissure of Wernekinck. It is important as an anatomical landmark, as lesions above it cause contralateral cerebellar signs, while lesions below it cause ipsilateral cerebellar signs.

== Additional images ==
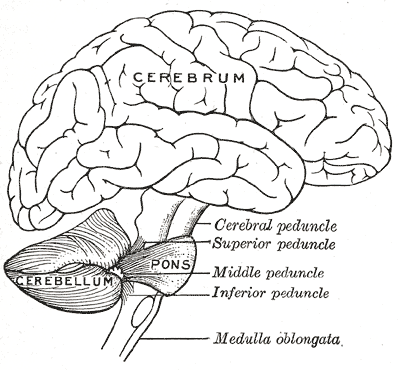
Scheme showing the connections of the several parts of the brain.

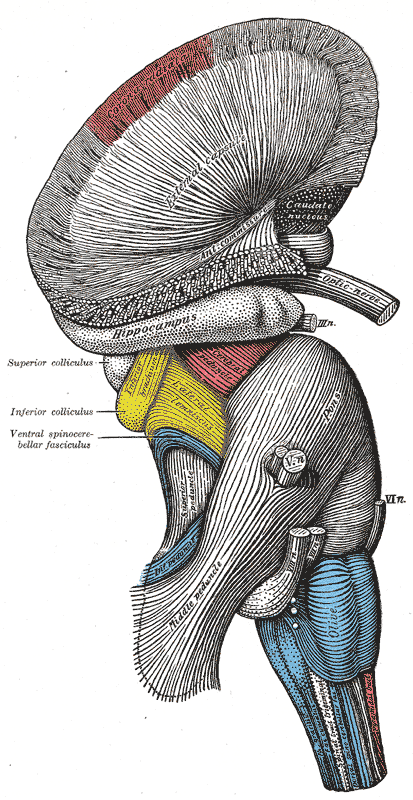
Superficial dissection of brain-stem. Lateral view.

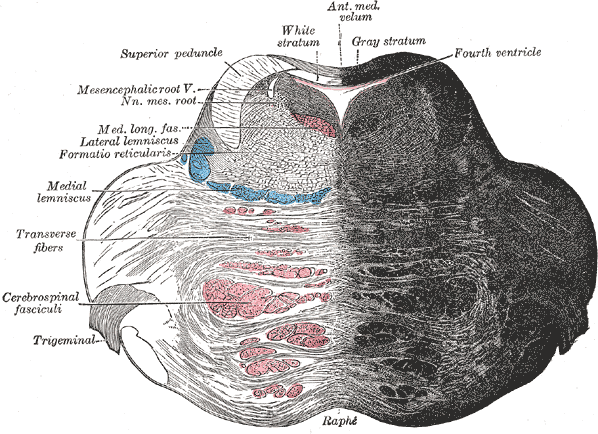
Axial section of the pons, at its dorsal (superior) part.

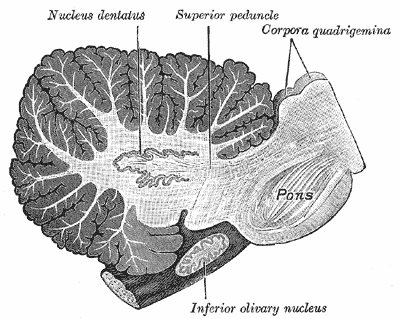
Sagittal section through right cerebellar hemisphere. The right olive has also been cut sagittally.

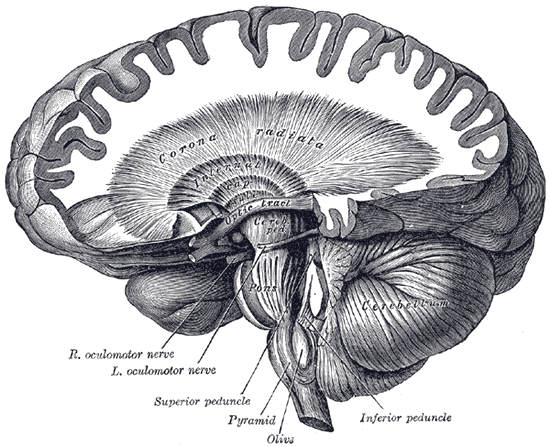
Dissection showing the course of the cerebrospinal fibers.

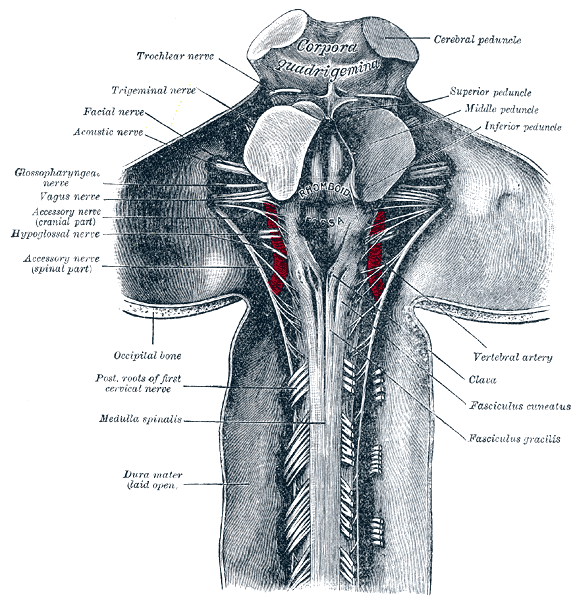
Upper part of medulla spinalis and hind- and mid-brains; posterior aspect, exposed in situ.
