= White matter =

Areas of myelinated axons in the brain

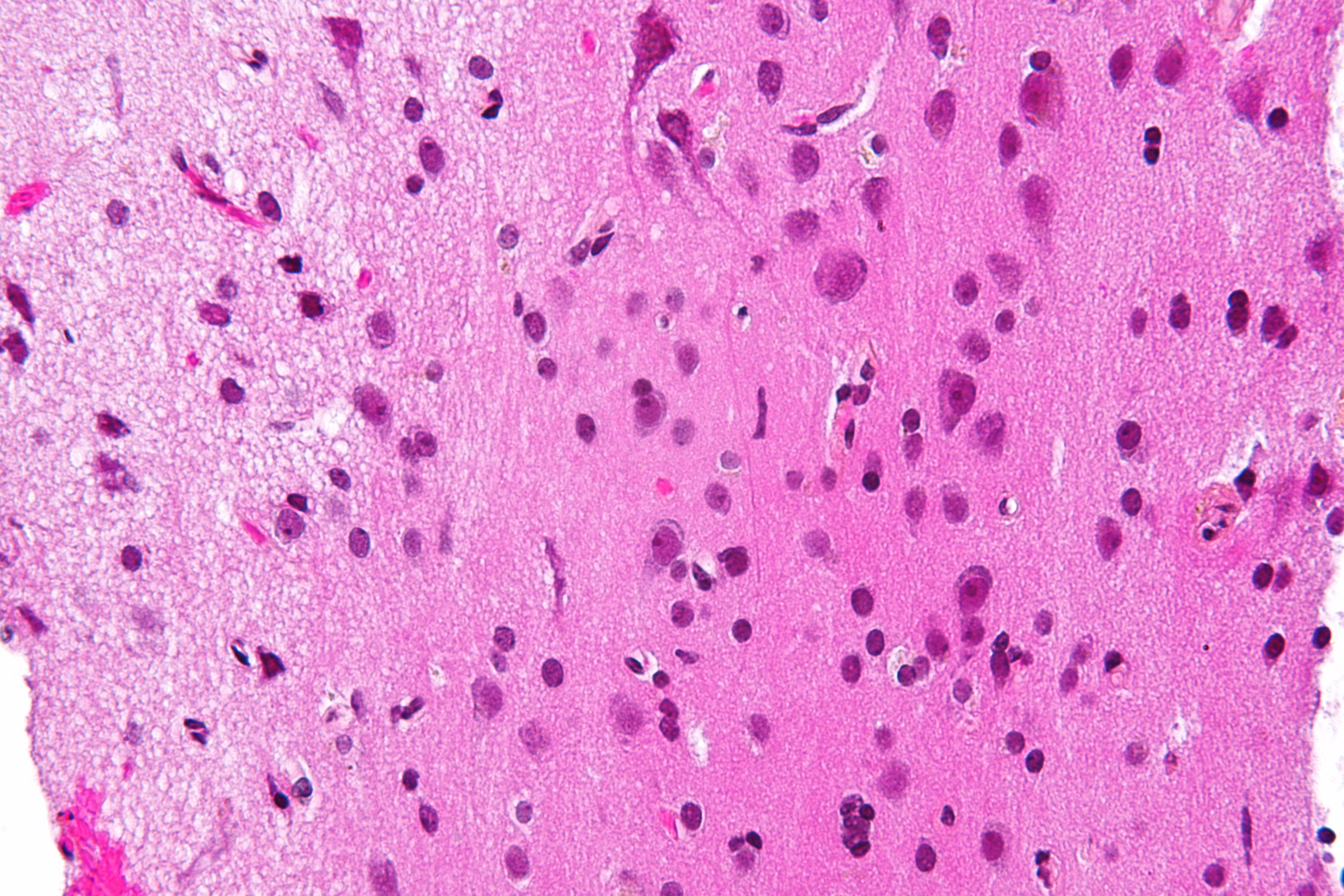
- Micrograph showing white matter with its characteristic fine meshwork-like appearance (left of image – lighter shade of pink) and grey matter, with the characteristic neuronal cell bodies (right of image – dark shade of pink). HPS stain.

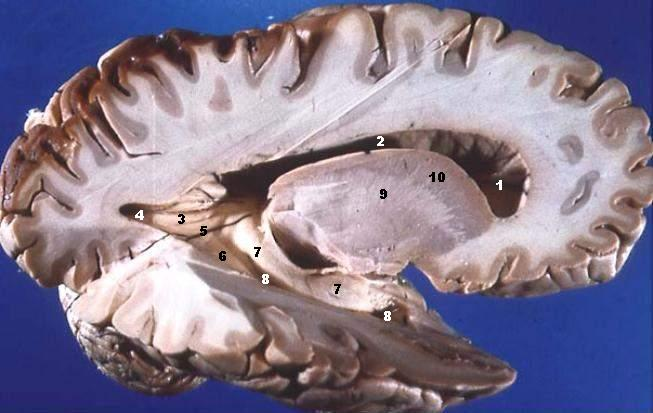
- Human brain right dissected lateral view (anterior on the right), showing grey matter (the darker outer parts), and white matter (the inner and prominently whiter parts).

Details
- Location: Central nervous system

Identifiers
- Latin: substantia alba
- MeSH: D066127
- TA98: A14.1.00.009; A14.1.02.024; A14.1.02.201; A14.1.04.101; A14.1.05.102; A14.1.05.302; A14.1.06.201
- TA2: 5366
- FMA: 83929

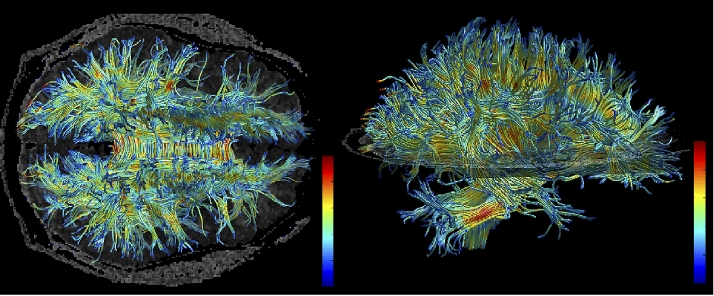
White matter structure of human brain (taken by MRI). Anterior on the right.

White matter refers to areas of the central nervous system that are mainly made up of myelinated axons, also called tracts. Long thought to be passive tissue, white matter affects learning and brain functions, modulating the distribution of action potentials, acting as a relay and coordinating communication between different brain regions.

White matter is named for its relatively light appearance resulting from the lipid content of myelin. Its white color in prepared specimens is due to its usual preservation in formaldehyde. It appears pinkish-white to the naked eye otherwise, because myelin is composed largely of lipid tissue veined with capillaries.

== Structure ==
=== White matter ===
White matter is composed of bundles, which connect various grey matter areas (the locations of nerve cell bodies) of the brain to each other, and carry nerve impulses between neurons. Myelin acts as an insulator, which allows electrical signals to jump, rather than coursing through the axon, increasing the speed of transmission of all nerve signals.

The total number of long range fibers within a cerebral hemisphere is 2% of the total number of cortico-cortical fibers (across cortical areas) and is roughly the same number as those that communicate between the two hemispheres in the brain's largest white tissue structure, the corpus callosum. Schüz and Braitenberg note "As a rough rule, the number of fibres of a certain range of lengths is inversely proportional to their length."

The proportion of blood vessels in the white matter in nonelderly adults is 1.7–3.6%.

=== Grey matter ===
The other main component of the brain is grey matter (actually pinkish tan due to blood capillaries), which is composed of neurons. The substantia nigra is a third colored component found in the brain that appears darker due to higher levels of melanin in dopaminergic neurons than its nearby areas. White matter can sometimes appear darker than grey matter on a microscope slide because of the type of stain used. Cerebral and spinal white matter do not contain dendrites, neural cell bodies, or shorter axons, which can only be found in grey matter.

=== Location ===
White matter forms the bulk of the deep parts of the brain and the superficial parts of the spinal cord. Aggregates of grey matter such as the basal ganglia (caudate nucleus, putamen, globus pallidus, substantia nigra, subthalamic nucleus, nucleus accumbens) and brainstem nuclei (red nucleus, cranial nerve nuclei) are spread within the cerebral white matter.

The cerebellum is structured in a similar manner as the cerebrum, with a superficial mantle of cerebellar cortex, deep cerebellar white matter (called the "arbor vitae") and aggregates of grey matter surrounded by deep cerebellar white matter (dentate nucleus, globose nucleus, emboliform nucleus, and fastigial nucleus). The fluid-filled cerebral ventricles (lateral ventricles, third ventricle, cerebral aqueduct, fourth ventricle) are also located deep within the cerebral white matter.

=== Myelinated axon length ===
One small study found that men have more white matter than women both in volume and in length of myelinated axons, and that volume and length reduced with age. At the age of 20, the total length of myelinated fibers in men is 176,000 km while that of a woman is 149,000 km. There is a decline in total length with age of about 10% each decade such that a man at 80 years of age has 97,200 km and a woman 82,000 km. Most of this reduction is due to the loss of thinner fibers. However, this reduction may correlate with men having larger brains than women and with brain size reducing with age.

== Function ==
White matter is the tissue through which messages pass between different areas of grey matter within the central nervous system. The white matter is white because of the fatty substance (myelin) that surrounds the nerve fibers (axons). This myelin is found in almost all long nerve fibers, and acts as an electrical insulation. This is important because it allows the messages to pass quickly from place to place.

Unlike grey matter, which peaks in development in a person's twenties, the white matter continues to develop, and peaks in middle age.

== Research ==
Multiple sclerosis (MS) is the most common of the inflammatory demyelinating diseases of the central nervous system which affect white matter. In MS lesions, the myelin sheath around the axons is deteriorated by inflammation. Alcohol use disorders are associated with a decrease in white matter volume.

Amyloid plaques in white matter may be associated with Alzheimer's disease and other neurodegenerative diseases. Other changes that commonly occur with age include the development of leukoaraiosis, which is a rarefaction of the white matter that can be correlated with a variety of conditions, including loss of myelin pallor, axonal loss, and diminished restrictive function of the blood–brain barrier.

There is also evidence that substance abuse may damage white matter microstructure, though prolonged abstinence may in certain cases reverse such white matter changes.

White matter lesions on magnetic resonance imaging are linked to several adverse outcomes, such as cognitive impairment and depression. White matter hyperintensities are often found in patients with vascular dementia, particularly with small vessel/subcortical subtypes of vascular dementia.

Environmental exposures can negatively impact on white matter. For example, exposure to air pollution in early childhood has been associated with microstructural changes in white matter: higher levels of ambient nitrogen dioxide in the first four years of life have been found to be linked to decreased white matter integrity.

=== Volume ===
Smaller volumes (in terms of group averages) of white matter might be associated with larger deficits in attention, declarative memory, executive functions, intelligence, and academic achievement. However, volume change is continuous throughout one's lifetime due to neuroplasticity, and is a contributing factor rather than determinant factor of certain functional deficits due to compensating effects in other brain regions. The integrity of white matter declines due to aging. Nonetheless, regular aerobic exercise appears to either postpone the aging effect or in turn enhance the white matter integrity in the long run. Changes in white matter volume due to inflammation or injury may be a factor in the severity of obstructive sleep apnea.

== Imaging ==
The study of white matter has been advanced with the neuroimaging technique called diffusion tensor imaging where magnetic resonance imaging (MRI) brain scanners are used. As of 2007, more than 700 publications have been published on the subject.

A 2009 paper by Jan Scholz and colleagues used diffusion tensor imaging (DTI) to demonstrate changes in white matter volume as a result of learning a new motor task (e.g. juggling). The study is important as the first paper to correlate motor learning with white matter changes. Previously, many researchers had considered this type of learning to be exclusively mediated by dendrites, which are not present in white matter. The authors suggest that electrical activity in axons may regulate myelination in axons. Or, gross changes in the diameter or packing density of the axon might cause the change. A more recent DTI study by Sampaio-Baptista and colleagues reported changes in white matter with motor learning along with increases in myelination.

== See also ==
- White matter dissection
- Ventriculomegaly
- Vascular dementia
- Vanishing white matter disease
- Brain atrophy
