= Emboliform nucleus =

Part of the interposed nucleus, a structure in the cerebellum

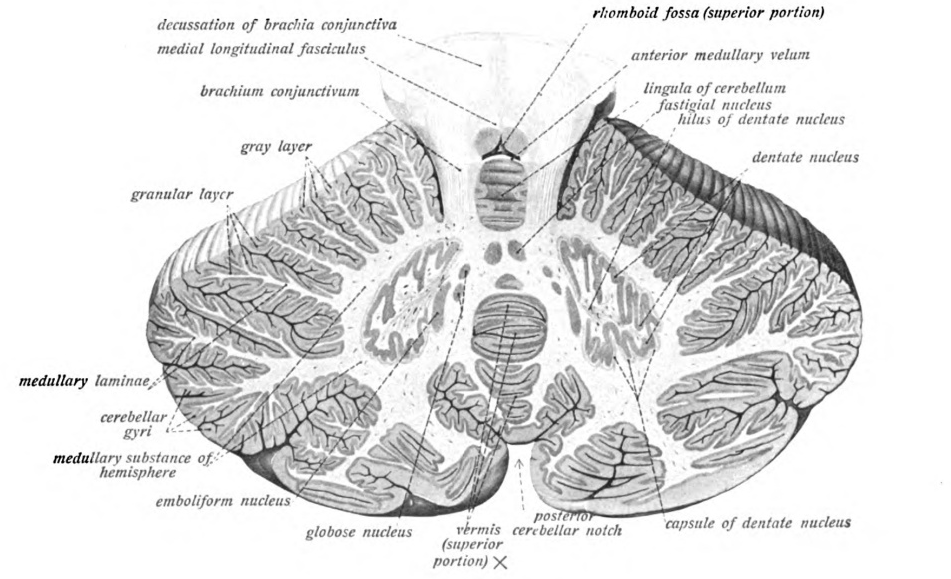
- Cross-section of the cerebellum. Emboliform nucleus labeled at bottom-left.

Details

Identifiers
- Latin: nucleus emboliformis
- NeuroNames: 688
- NeuroLex ID: birnlex_1135
- TA98: A14.1.07.409
- TA2: 5838
- FMA: 72538

The emboliform nucleus is a deep cerebellar nucleus that lies immediately to the medial side of the dentate nucleus, partly covering its hilum. It is one of the four pairs of deep cerebellar nuclei, which are from lateral to medial: the dentate, emboliform, globose and fastigial. These nuclei can be seen using Weigert's elastic stain.

In lower mammals the emboliform nucleus appears to be continuous with the globose nucleus, and these are known together as the interposed nucleus.

Emboliform, from Ancient Greek, means "shaped like a plug or wedge".

== Structure ==
The emboliform nucleus is a wedge-shaped structure of gray matter found at the medial side of the hilum of the dentate nucleus. Its neurons display a similar structure from those of the dentate nucleus. In some mammals the emboliform nucleus is continuous with the globose nucleus, forming together the interposed nucleus. When present, the interposed nucleus can be divided in an anterior and a posterior interposed nucleus, considered homologues of the emboliform and globose nuclei, respectively.

== Function ==
The emboliform participates in the spinocerebellum, a system that regulates the precision of limb movements. Axons leaving the emboliform exit through the superior cerebellar peduncle and reach the red nucleus in the midbrain and several thalamic nuclei which project into areas of the cerebral cortex that control limb movement.
