= Olivocerebellar tract =

Neural fibers in the medulla oblongata

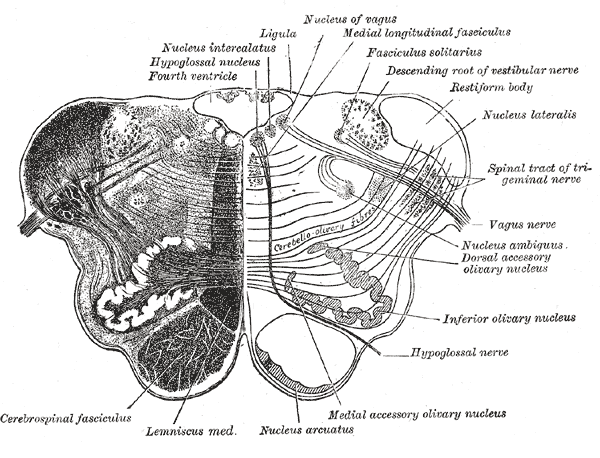
- Transverse section of medulla oblongata below the middle of the olive. (Cerebello-olivary fibers visible at center right.)

Details

Identifiers
- Latin: tractus olivocerebellaris
- NeuroNames: 804
- NeuroLex ID: birnlex_1579
- TA98: A14.1.04.118
- TA2: 5853
- FMA: 72638

The olivocerebellar tract, also known as olivocerebellar fibers, are neural fibers (axons) that originate in a bag-shaped collection of neurons called the inferior olivary nucleus in the medulla oblongata of the lower brainstem. The neurons of the inferior olive use glutamate as a neurotransmitter, and they also express the neuropeptide corticotropin-releasing hormone.

The olivocerebellar fibers exit the inferior olive through the hilum, cross the midline, pass through and around the contralateral inferior olivary nucleus and then enter the contralateral cerebellar hemisphere via the inferior cerebellar peduncle. In the cerebellar cortex the axons form the climbing fiber input system (so-called because the fibers ascend the dendrites of Purkinje cells); they terminate directly on the Purkinje cells where they exert a strong excitatory influence.
