= Dentate nucleus =

Nucleus in the centre of each cerebellar hemisphere

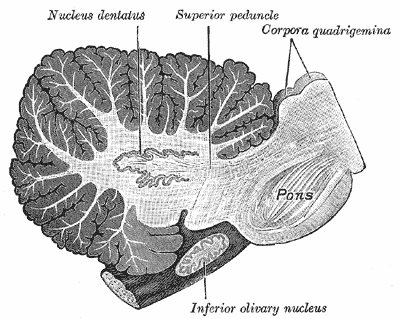
- Sagittal section through right cerebellar hemisphere. The right olive, "inferior olivary nucleus", has also been cut sagittally – from front to back. (Dentate nucleus, "nucleus dentatus", labeled at top.)

Details
- Part of: cerebellum
- Artery: superior cerebellar artery

Identifiers
- Latin: nucleus dentatus
- NeuroNames: 683
- NeuroLex ID: birnlex_1171
- TA98: A14.1.07.407
- TA2: 5836
- FMA: 72260

The dentate nucleus refer to a pair of deep cerebellar nuclei deep within the white matter of the cerebellum of the brain with a dentate – tooth-like or serrated – edge. The dentate forms the largest pathway between the cerebellum and the remainder of the brain. It is the largest and most lateral of the four pairs of deep cerebellar nuclei, the others being the globose and emboliform nuclei, which together are referred to as the interposed nucleus, and the fastigial nucleus.

The dentate nucleus is responsible for the planning, initiation and control of voluntary movements. The dorsal region of the dentate nucleus contains output channels involved in motor function, which is the movement of skeletal muscle, while the ventral region contains output channels involved in nonmotor function, such as conscious thought and visuospatial function.

== Development ==
The dentate nucleus is highly convoluted, with gyri (ridges on the cerebral cortex) and sulci (furrows or grooves on the cerebral cortex). Its formation is coincident with a critical period of extensive growth in the fetal dentate. The dentate nucleus becomes visible in the cerebellar white matter as early as 11–12 weeks of gestation, containing only smooth lateral (towards the side(s) or away from the midline) and medial (towards the midline) surfaces. During this time, the neurons of the dentate nucleus are similar in shape and form, being mainly bipolar cells.

During 22–28 weeks of gestation, which is the critical period in fetal development of the dentate nucleus, gyral formation occurs extensively over the entire surface. Here, neurons mature into various forms of multipolar cells, and the most frequent neuronal types are medium-sized to large neurons.

== Structure ==
=== Location ===
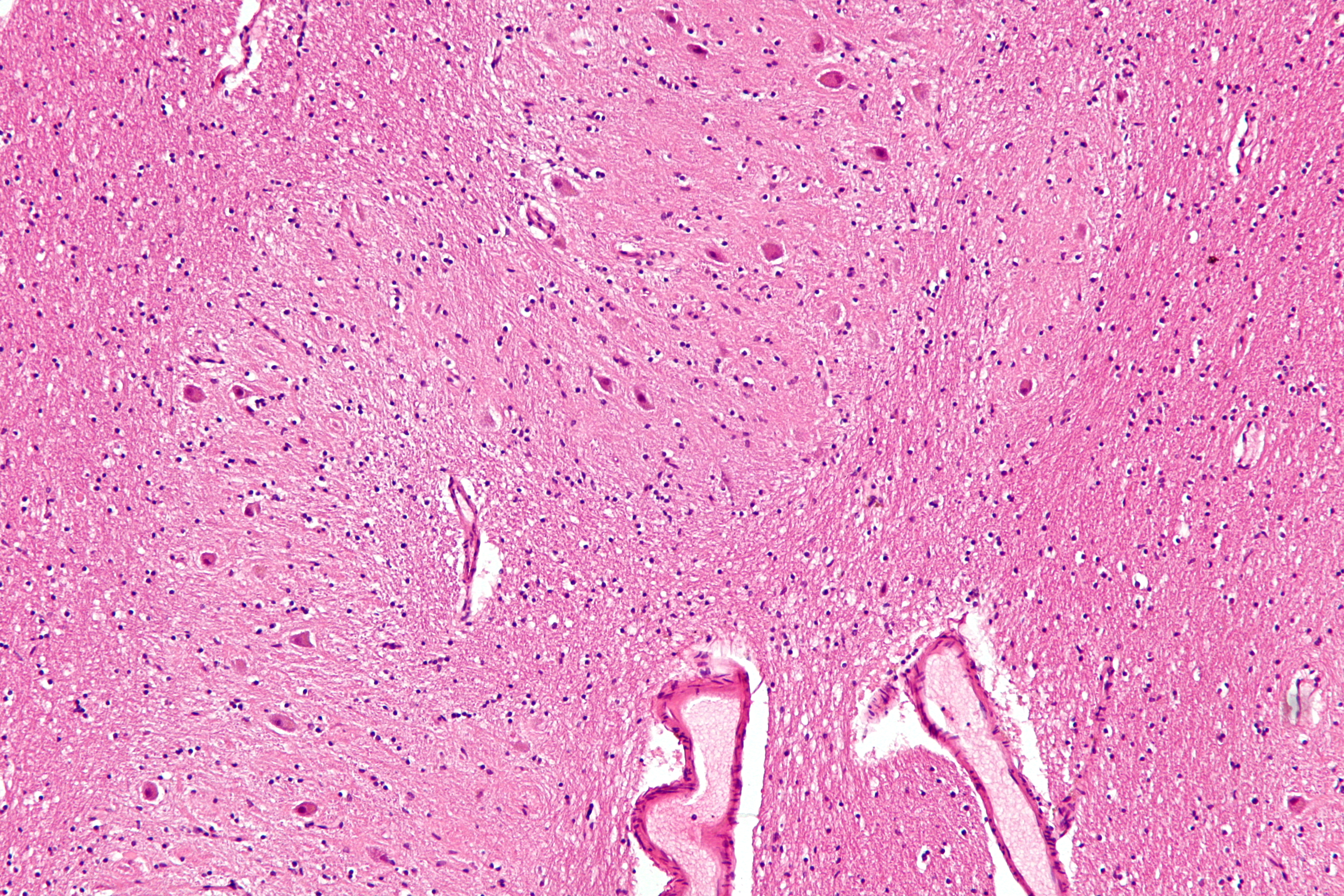
Micrograph of the dentate nucleus (pale pink). H&E stain.

The architecture of cerebellum is a repeating fractal, so a slice anywhere in the cerebellum gives consistent neuronal branching patterns. The eight cerebellar nuclei, located within the deep white matter of each cerebellar hemisphere, are grouped into pairs, with one of each pair in each of the two hemispheres. As a chunk of tissue, the dentate nucleus with overlying cerebellar cortex makes up a functional unit called the cerebrocerebellum. Thus, there is a part of cerebellum that communicates exclusively with the dentate nucleus.

==== Deep cerebellar nuclei ====
- Dentate: The dentate nucleus is the largest, most lateral, and phylogenetically most recent of the cerebellar nuclei. It receives afferent, or incoming, signals from the premotor cortex and supplementary motor cortex via the pontocerebellar system. Efferent, or outgoing, signals travel via the superior cerebellar peduncle through the red nucleus to the contralateral – opposite side – Ventroanterior/Ventrolateral (VA/VL) thalamus.
- Interposed: The globose and emboliform nuclei together make up the interposed nucleus. The interposed nucleus is the smallest of the cerebellar nuclei. It is located between the dentate and fastigial nuclei. It receives afferent supply from the anterior (toward the front) lobe of the cerebellum and sends output to the contralateral red nucleus through the superior cerebellar peduncle. This nucleus is the origin of the rubrospinal tract that mainly influences limb flexor muscles.
- Fastigial: The fastigial nucleus is the most medial. It receives afferent input from the vermis, and efferents travel via the inferior cerebellar peduncle to the vestibular nuclei.

The deep cerebellar nuclei receive the final output from the cerebellar cortex via Purkinje cells in the form of inhibition. Neurons in the cerebellar nuclei generate spontaneous action potentials despite ongoing inhibition from Purkinje cells. The cerebellar nuclei receive afferent projections from the inferior olive, lateral reticular nucleus, upper cervical and lumbar spinal segments, and the Pontine nuclei. Together, the deep cerebellar nuclei form a functional unit that provides feedback control of the cerebellar cortex by cerebellar output.

=== Morphology ===
The dentate nucleus is highly convoluted and can be divided into dorsal (motor) and ventral (nonmotor) domains. The ventral half is much more developed in humans than in great apes, and it appears to play an important role in fiber connection. Further, the ventral domain mediates higher cerebellar functions, such as language and cognition, as well as versatile and coordinated finger movement. While it is generally accepted that the ventral region is more recent on an evolutionary timescale, current 3-Dimensional imaging raises questions regarding this assumption, as a third axis, the rostrocaudal axis, can now be analyzed. In addition, current images show that the ventral region is not physically larger than the dorsal region in humans, as would be predicted if size increases with cognitive function.

The neurons of the adult dentate are divided based on size, morphology, and function into large principal and small local circuit neurons.

==== Large principal neurons ====
The large principal neurons have been classified into four primary types according to position within the dentate, shape of soma (cell body), and dendritic branching. These neurons are responsible for communication between the dentate nucleus and the cerebellar cortex.

- Central neurons: The central neurons are located in deeper parts of the nuclear mass, away from the periphery. They have round and prickly somata, and numerous dendritic trunks emerge from every direction of the soma. These dendrites have complex branching patterns and spherical dendritic fields.
- Border neurons: The border neurons are concentrated at the boundary of the nuclear lamina and have elliptical somata. They have a stout axon directed into the surrounding white matter, as well as four to six primary dendrites that branch from the opposite end. The dendritic fields of these neurons have a tetrahedron shape with the cell body in one corner.
- Intermediate asymmetric neurons: The intermediate asymmetrical neurons are evenly distributed throughout the nuclear mass, and they have large, elliptical somata. They have five to nine dendrites branching in all directions, with one or two much longer than the others.
- Intermediate fusiform neurons: The intermediate fusiform neurons are scattered throughout the dentate, and they have elongated and elliptical somata which are tapered at both ends. They include three to five primary dendrites which divide into several long dendrites. The upper part of the cell body is parallel to the apical dendrites, which are oriented toward the nuclear core.

==== Small local circuit neurons ====
Small local circuit neurons include signaling pathways that are contained within the dentate. These neurons provide feedback to the dentate and allow for fine control of signaling. Currently, less research has been conducted on the specific shape and role of these neurons, as the dentate nucleus is composed primarily of large principal neurons.

== Function ==
=== Projections ===
The dentate contains anatomically separate and functionally distinct motor and nonmotor domains (dorsal and ventral, respectively), and projections are organized from the dentate nucleus to distinct areas in the ventrolateral thalamus. Through the thalamus, the dorsal parts of the dentate project to the primary motor and premotor areas of the cerebral cortex, while the ventral parts of the dentate project to prefrontal and posterior parietal areas of the cerebral cortex. The motor and nonmotor domains make up approximately 50–60 percent and 20 percent, respectively, of the dentate. It is estimated that the human dentate proportions are comparable. All cerebral cortical areas that are targeted by the dentate project back on the cerebellum via efferents to Pontine nuclei, and cortical areas that do not project onto the cerebellum are not targets of dentate output. The motor domain in the dorsal portion of the dentate contains output channels that control both generation and control of movement, as well as neurons that innervate premotor areas in the frontal lobe. The nonmotor domain contains output channels involved in cognition and visuospatial function, and projections to the prefrontal and posterior parietal cortical areas within this region are clustered into distinct regions with little overlap. These areas are activated during tasks involving short-term working memory, rule-based learning, and higher executive function-like planning. Although the ventral aspect of the dentate has been shown to be involved in acquisition of information, whether it is involved in retention and storage remains unclear.

=== Pathways ===
There are three distinct routes from the dentate nucleus to the ventrolateral thalamus, including a direct, posterior, and anterior route. The direct route passes in the anterolateral direction under the thalamus and enters from the ventral side. Axons following the posterior pathway turn dorsally from the midline at the posterior side of the thalamus, entering the thalamus from various positions. Axons following the anterior route pass laterally in the subthalamus and enter the external medullary lamina. Within the lamina, fibers turn posteriorly and enter the dorsal side of the thalamus. Therefore, as a result of these various pathways, the neurons of the dentate nucleus are able to traverse all thalamic nuclei, with the exception of those at the midline and anterior nuclear groups.

Dentate nucleus axons can be divergent or convergent. Convergent branches include those that originate from entirely different axons and traverse different routes, yet overlap on the same terminal field. Divergent pathways originate from the same axon but travel different routes and target different terminal fields. Although no point-to-point connectivity has been observed between the dentate nucleus and the thalamus, it is believed that there is a pre-wired connectivity between a single dentate site and several body part representations in the thalamus.

Three modalities are received by cerebellum, including proprioception, nociception, and somatic input, and all of these stimulate the dentate nucleus. The dentate nucleus is mostly responsible for planning and execution of fine movement. Since any motor function requires sensory information, it can be assumed that the dentate nucleus receives and modulates this sensory information, though the specific mechanism of this remains unclear. For example, the act of lifting an object requires sensory input, such as the size of the object and where it is located in space. While the primary role of the dentate nucleus is control of the movement, it does play a role in sensory processing as well.

=== Role ===
The role of the dentate nucleus can be described in two basic tenets:

1. The dentate nucleus is involved in basic circuitry work, including input to the cerebellum from everywhere else. Any function that needs coordination, including thoughts and motor behavior, must go through the cerebellum to be smoothened. This input travels in two parts, to the surface of the cerebellar cortex as well as collateral input to the cerebellar nuclei.
2. The whole cerebellum has only one output, which necessarily leads from the deep cerebellar nuclei. There is output from the cerebellar cortex, so this output must go through the cerebellar nuclei and send output to rest of nervous system. Thus, the cerebellum communicates to the outside world via the cerebellar nuclei. Input that reaches the cerebellar cortex is processed in many ways; eventually whatever happens in cerebellar cortex exits the cerebellum through a synapse in the cerebellar nuclei.

The dentate nucleus is responsible for the planning, initiation and control of voluntary movements. The dorsal region of the dentate contains output channels involved in motor function, while the ventral region contains output channels involved in nonmotor function, such as cognition and visuospatial function. The dentate nucleus sends commands and information to the motor and premotor areas in the forebrain.

== Clinical significance ==
Several pathological processes involve the dentate nucleus including metabolic, genetic, and neurodegenerative disorders, as well as some infections.

=== Metabolic disorders ===
Maple syrup urine disease (MSUD): An inherited disorder of amino acid metabolism in newborns, MSUD results in neurological deterioration. Myelin edema is seen in the cerebellum, including the dentate nucleus, brain stem, and corticospinal tracts.

Leigh disease: Clinical and pathological symptoms usually appear in the first year of life and include psychomotor retardation and brain stem dysfunction. Bilaterally symmetric defects are seen in the periaqueductal grey matter, brain stem, basal ganglia, and dentate nucleus.

Glutaric aciduria type 1 (GA1): An autosomal recessive disease, GA1 is due to glutaryl-coenzyme A dehydrogenase deficiency. Abnormalities are seen in the basal ganglia and dentate nucleus.

Canavan's disease: Canavan's disease is a white matter disease due to aspartoacylase deficiency. The dentate nucleus is not affected until late in disease progression.

=== Miscellaneous disorders ===
Neurofibromatosis type 1 (NF1): NF1 is an autosomal dominant neurocutaneous disorder. The hallmark of NF1 is the development of numerous tumors. Cerebellar white matter and dentate nucleus lesions usually occur in children less than ten years of age.

Langerhans cell histiocytosis (LCH): LCH is an aggressive disorder due to proliferation of Langerhans cell histiocytes, and the dentate nucleus is believed to be involved in up to 40 percent of patients.

Alzheimer's disease (AD) with myoclonus: There is an increase in mean volume of large neurons and a decrease in mean volume of small neurons in the dentate nucleus in AD with myoclonus. Morphological changes in the dentate nucleus may contribute to the pathological substrate of myoclonus in AD.

== Additional images ==
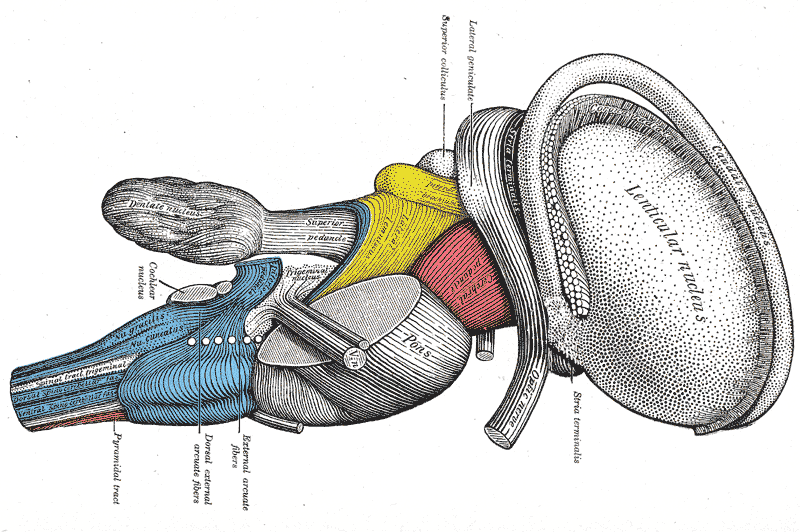
Dissection of brain-stem. Lateral view.

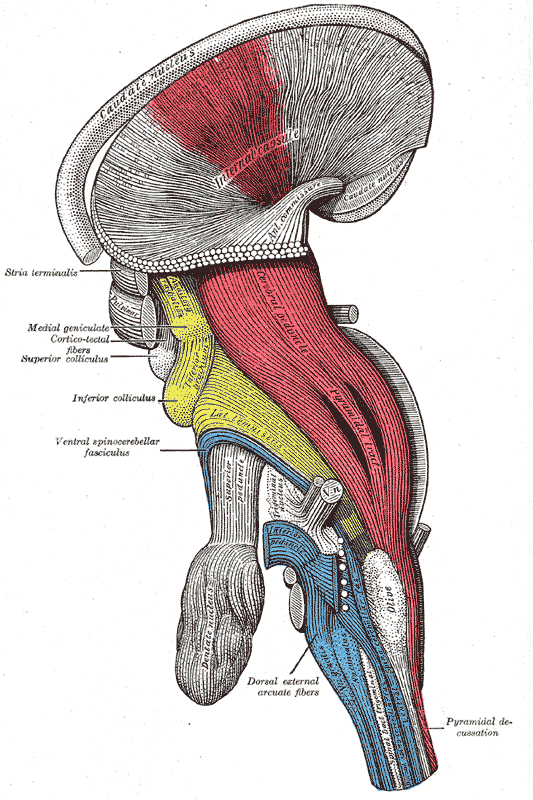
Deep dissection of brain-stem. Lateral view.

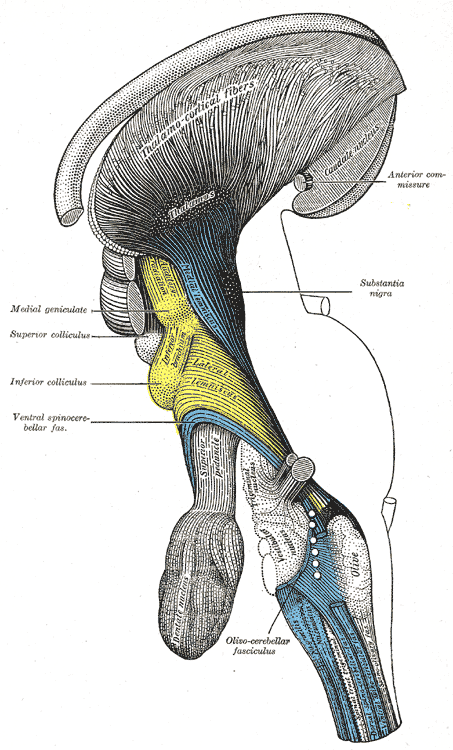
Deep dissection of brain-stem. Lateral view.

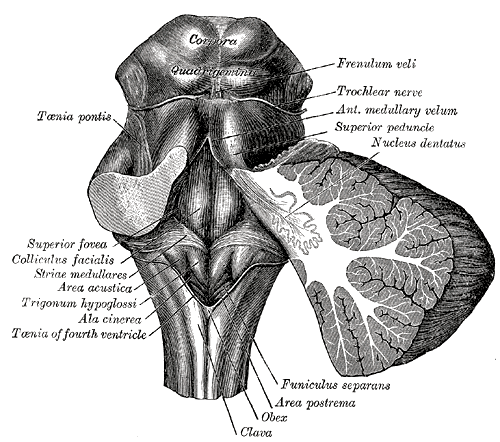
Rhomboid fossa.

== See also ==
- Cerebellum
- Cerebellar cortex
- Deep cerebellar nuclei
- Cerebral cortex
- Thalamus
