= Globose nucleus =

Part of the interposed nucleus, a structure in the cerebellum

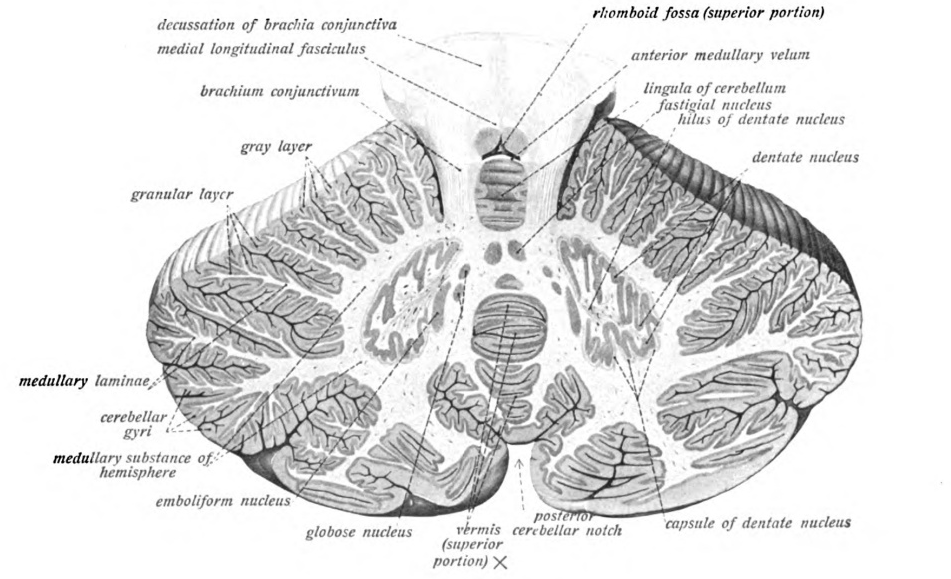
- Cross-section of the cerebellum. Globose nucleus labeled at the bottom of image.

Details

Identifiers
- Latin: nucleus globosus
- NeuroNames: 689
- NeuroLex ID: birnlex_1158
- TA98: A14.1.07.410
- TA2: 5839
- FMA: 72536

The globose nucleus is one of the deep cerebellar nuclei. It is located medial to the emboliform nucleus, and lateral to the fastigial nucleus. The globose nucleus and emboliform nucleus are known collectively as the interposed nuclei.

The globose nucleus is part of a neural circuit giving rise to descending motor tracts involved in motor control of distal musculature of the upper and lower limbs.

== Anatomy ==
=== Afferents ===
- Purkinje cells of (the paravermal cortex of) the spinocerebellum
- Anterior spinocerebellar tract (via restiform body of inferior cerebellar peduncle)

=== Efferents ===
- Contralateral (magnocellular division of) red nucleus (via the superior cerebellar peduncle). This is the major major efferent projection of the globose nucleus. The red nucleus in turn gives rise to the rubrospinal tract.
- Ipsilateral ventral lateral nucleus of thalamus. The VL nucleus in turn projects to the primary motor cortex and premotor cortex (which then give rise to the lateral corticospinal tract).

== Cell biology ==
This nucleus contains primarily large and small multipolar neurons.
