= Fastigial nucleus =

Grey matter nucleus in the cerebellum

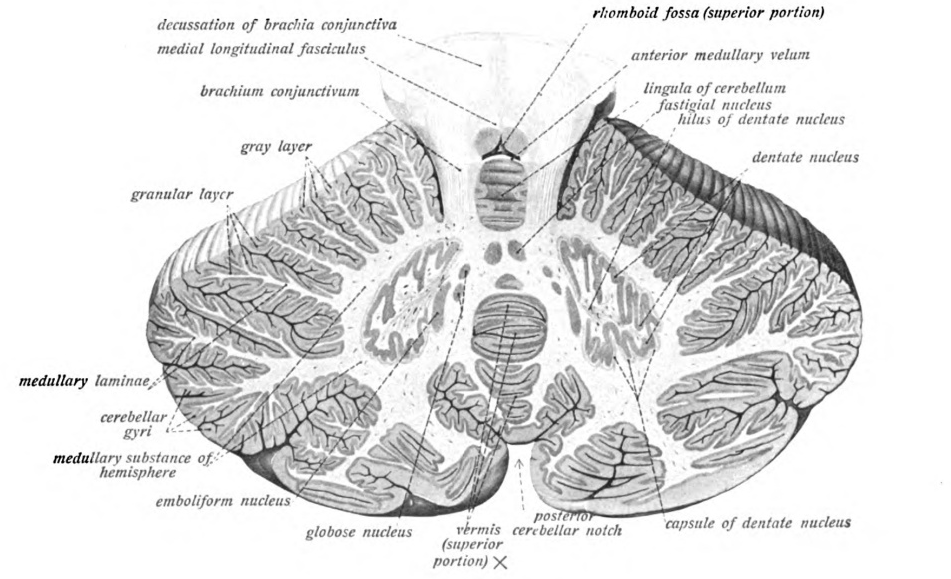
- Cross-section of the cerebellum. Fastigial nucleus labeled at top-right.

Details

Identifiers
- Latin: nucleus fastigii
- NeuroNames: 690
- NeuroLex ID: birnlex_1146
- TA98: A14.1.07.411
- TA2: 5840
- FMA: 72537

The fastigial nucleus (roof nucleus-1) is located in each cerebellar hemisphere. It is one of the four paired deep cerebellar nuclei of the cerebellum.

It is made up of two sections: the rostral fastigial nucleus and the caudal fastigial nucleus.

== Anatomy ==
The fastigial nuclei is situated atop the roof of the fourth ventricle (thence its name: "fastigus" is Latin for "summit").

The fastigial nucleus is a mass of gray matter nearest to the middle line at the anterior end of the superior vermis, immediately over the roof of the fourth ventricle (the peak of which is called the fastigium), from which it is separated by a thin layer of white matter.

It is smaller than the dentate nucleus, but somewhat larger than the emboliform nucleus and globose nucleus.

=== Afferents ===
The fastigial nucleus receives afferents from the vestibulocerebellar tract (containing first-order axons from the vestibular nerve as well as second-order axons from the vestibular nuclei), and from Purkinje cells of the vestibulocerebellum cortex.

=== Efferents ===
The fastigial nucleus projects efferents to: the medial, lateral and inferior vestibular nuclei, reticular formation, ventral lateral nucleus of thalamus, and cerebellar cortex. It gives rise to fastigiovestibular fibres, and fastigioreticular fibres: both leave the cerebellum via the juxtarestiform body of the inferior cerebellar peduncle.

- fastigiovestibular fibres project principally to the lateral and inferior vestibular nuclei to influence the vestibulospinal tract bilaterally;
- fastigioreticular fibres project to the (pontine and medullary) reticular formation to influence the reticulospinal tracts (bilaterally, but mainly contralaterally).

Through the vestibulospinal and reticulospinal tracts, the fastigial efferents are involved in regulation of balance and posture as well as axial and proximal limb musculature activity.

=== Structure ===
==== Rostral fastigial nucleus ====
The rostral fastigial nucleus (rFN) is related to the vestibular system. It receives input from the vestibular nuclei and contributes to vestibular neuronal activity. The rFN interprets body motion and places it on spatial planes to estimate the movement of the body through space. It deals with antigravity muscle groups and other synergies involved with standing and walking.

==== Caudal fastigial nucleus ====
The caudal fastigial nucleus (cFN) is related to saccadic eye movements. The Purkinje cell output from the oculomotor vermis relays through the cFN, where neurons directly related to saccadic eye movements are located.
