= Stellate cell =

Star-shaped neurons in the central nervous system

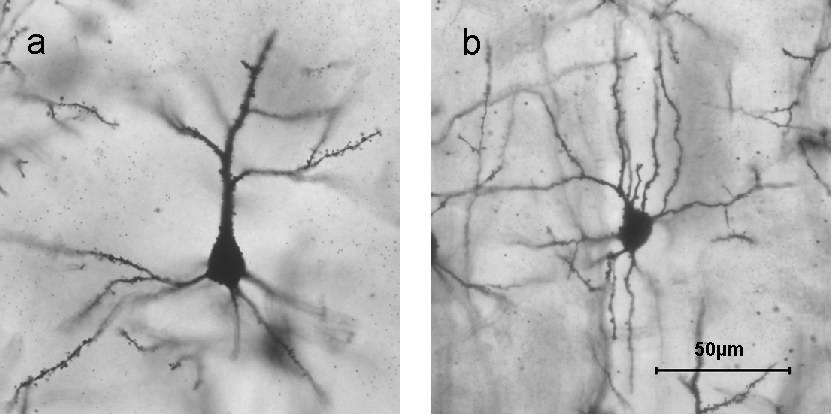
- Golgi stained cortical neurons A) Layer II/III pyramidal cell B) layer IV spiny stellate cell

- Microcircuitry of the cerebellum. Excitatory synapses are denoted by (+) and inhibitory synapses by (-). MF: Mossy fiber. DCN: Deep cerebellar nuclei. IO: Inferior olive. CF: Climbing fiber. GC: Granule cell. PF: Parallel fiber. PC: Purkinje cell. GgC: Golgi cell. SC: Stellate cell. BC: Basket cell.

Identifiers
- NeuroLex ID: sao2046525601

Stellate cells are neurons in the central nervous system, named for their star-like shape formed by dendritic processes radiating from the cell body. These cells play significant roles in various brain functions, including inhibition in the cerebellum and excitation in the cortex, and are involved in synaptic plasticity and neurovascular coupling.

== Morphology ==
Stellate cells are characterized by their star-shaped dendritic trees. Dendrites can vary between neurons, with stellate cells being either spiny or aspinous. In contrast, pyramidal cells, which are also found in the cerebral cortex, are always spiny and pyramid-shaped. The classification of neurons often depends on the presence or absence of dendritic spines: those with spines are classified as spiny, while those without are classified as aspinous.

== Types and locations ==
=== Cerebellar ===
Many stellate cells are GABAergic and are located in the molecular layer of the cerebellum. Most common stellate cells are the inhibitory interneurons found within the upper half of the molecular layer in the cerebellum. These cells synapse onto the dendritic trees of Purkinje cells and send inhibitory signals. Stellate cells are derived from dividing progenitor cells in the white matter of the postnatal cerebellum.

=== Cortical ===
Stellate neurons are also found in the cortex. Cortical spiny stellate cells are located in layer IVC of the primary visual cortex, and in the somatosensory barrel cortex of mice and rats, glutamatergic (excitatory) spiny stellate cells are organized in layer 4 of the barrel cortex. These cells receive excitatory synaptic fibers from the thalamus and process feed-forward excitation to layers 2/3 of the primary visual cortex to pyramidal cells. Cortical spiny stellate cells exhibit a 'regular' firing pattern.

=== Other locations ===
GABAergic aspinous stellate cells are also found in the somatosensory cortex. These cells can be immunohistochemically labeled with glutamic acid decarboxylase (GAD) due to their GABAergic activity, and they occasionally colocalize with neuropeptides.

== Development ==
Stellate and basket cells originate from the cerebellar ventricular zone (CVZ) along with Purkinje cells and Bergmann glia. These cells follow a similar pathway during migration, starting in the deep layer of the white matter, moving through the internal granular layer (IGL) and the Purkinje cell layer (PCL) until reaching the molecular layer. In the molecular layer, stellate cells change orientation and positioning until they reach their final placement, guided by Bergmann glial cells.

== Function ==
Stellate cells receive Excitatory Post Synaptic Potentials (EPSCs) from parallel fibers. The characteristics of these EPSCs depend on the pattern and frequency of presynaptic activity, influencing the extent and duration of inhibition within the cerebellar cortex. Synapses between parallel fibers and stellate cells exhibit plasticity, allowing for long-term changes in synaptic efficacy. This synaptic plasticity can occur at both parallel fiber-stellate cell synapses and parallel fiber-Purkinje cell synapses, suggesting a role in cerebellar motor learning.

=== Neurovascular Coupling ===
Cerebellar stellate cells also play a crucial role in neurovascular coupling. Electrophysiological stimulation of single stellate cells is sufficient to release nitric oxide (NO) and induce dilation of blood vessels.

== See also ==
- Stellate ganglion
- List of distinct cell types in the adult human body
