= Golgi cell =

- Microcircuitry of the cerebellum. Excitatory synapses are denoted by (+) and inhibitory synapses by (-). MF: Mossy fiber. DCN: Deep cerebellar nuclei. IO: Inferior olive. CF: Climbing fiber. GC: Granule cell. PF: Parallel fiber. PC: Purkinje cell. GgC: Golgi cell. SC: Stellate cell. BC: Basket cell.

Details
- Location: Granular layer of the cerebellum

Identifiers
- NeuroLex ID: nifext_129

In neuroscience, Golgi cells are the most abundant inhibitory interneurons found within the granular layer of the cerebellum. Golgi cells can be found in the granular layer at various layers. The Golgi cell is essential for controlling the activity of the granular layer. They were first identified as inhibitory in 1964. It was also the first example of an inhibitory feedback network in which the inhibitory interneuron was identified anatomically. Golgi cells produce a wide lateral inhibition that reaches beyond the afferent synaptic field and inhibit granule cells via feedforward and feedback inhibitory loops. These cells synapse onto the dendrite of granule cells and unipolar brush cells. They receive excitatory input from mossy fibres, also synapsing on granule cells, and parallel fibers, which are long granule cell axons. Thereby this circuitry allows for feed-forward and feed-back inhibition of granule cells.

== Connections ==
The cerebellar network contains a large number of connections between Golgi cells. The main synapse made by these cells is a synapse onto the mossy fibre–granule cell excitatory synapse in a glomerulus. The glomerulus is made up of the mossy fibre terminal, granule cell dendrites, and the Golgi terminal, and is enclosed by a glial coat. The Golgi cell acts by altering the mossy fibre - granule cell synapse. According to reports, granule cells mostly connect to the Golgi cell through parallel fibers, while synapses may also play a role. It has been shown that the climbing fibers connect to the Golgi cells by reentering the higher granular layer through thin collateral branches that reach slightly below the Purkinje cells. Three different types of inhibitory interneurons—basket and stellate cells, which are found in the molecular layer, and Golgi cells, which are found in the granular layer—are triggered by parallel fibers and control the activity of Purkinje cells.

In the theta frequency range, Golgi cells exhibit pacemaking, resonance, phase-reset, and rebound-excitation. These characteristics probably have an effect on their behavior. In vivo, exhibiting erratic, spontaneous beating regulated by sensory inputs and sudden, quiet pauses between burst responses to punctuate stimulus. Furthermore, the network's Golgi cell interaction offers insight into how these neurons may control the spatiotemporal arrangement of cerebellar activity. It turns out that Golgi cells can affect both the temporal dynamics and the geographical distribution of information relayed across the cerebellar network. Golgi cells also control the mossy fiber–granule cell synapse's production of long-term synaptic plasticity. Thus, the idea that Golgi cells play a crucial role in controlling the activity of the granular layer network, which has significant implications for cerebellar computing, is beginning to take shape.

Glutamatergic stimuli are the primary excitatory inputs to Golgi cells. Current research indicates that NMDA receptors and AMPA receptors are involved at mossy fiber-Golgi cell relays. Golgi cell circuit functions also seem to be regulated by metabotropic glutamate receptors. Golgi cells possess mGluR2 receptors, and when these receptors are activated, an inward rectifier K current is enhanced, aiding in the Golgi cell's silencing after a period of intensive granule cell-Golgi cell transmission. This mGluR2-dependent process could make it easier for extended bursts to travel through the mossy fiber-granule cell route.

== Neurotransmitters ==
Golgi cells predominantly use GABA and glycine as neurotransmitters, although depending on their target, a single Golgi cell will selectively facilitate GABAergic or glycinergic transmission. When Golgi cells are activated, granule cells and UBCs exhibit GABAergic and glycinergic currents, respectively. This is primarily because Golgi cells corelease GABA and glycine at each individual bouton, which is a result of cell-type-specific postsynaptic receptor expression and/or trafficking to the synapse. Based on electron microscopy and electrophysiological evidence, it was believed that molecular layer interneurons (stellate and basket cells) form GABAergic synapses on Golgi cell dendrites. However, more recent research challenges the existence of these functional synapses. Instead, local interneurons provide just a small fraction of the inhibitory inputs to Golgi cells in the molecular layer, and most of these inputs only release GABA. Rather, Golgi cells are innervated by GABAergic cells in the DCN, indicating that Golgi cells get a large input of feedback inhibition from the deep cerebellar nuclei to modulate local inhibitory networks. The basal level of GABA produces a postsynaptic leak conductance by tonically activating alpha 6-containing GABA-A receptors on the granule cell. These high-affinity receptors are located both synaptically and extrasynaptically on the granule cell. The synaptic receptors mediate phasic contraction, duration of around 20–30ms, whereas the extrasynapatic receptors mediate tonic inhibition of around 200ms, and are activated by synapse spill over.

Additionally the GABA acts on GABA-B receptors which are located presynaptically on the mossy fibre terminal. These inhibit the mossy fibre evoked EPSCs of the granule cell in a temperature and frequency dependent manner. At high mossy firing frequency (10 Hz) there is no effect of GABA acting on presynaptic GABA-B receptors on evoked EPSCs. However, at low (1 Hz) firing the GABA does have an effect on the EPSCs mediated via these presynaptic GABA-B receptors.

Golgi cells are necessary for complex motor coordination, as this study shows "Ablation of Cerebellar Golgi Cells Disrupts Synaptic Integration Involving GABA Inhibition and NMDA Receptor Activation in Motor Coordination" conducted by Watanabe, D., Inokawa, H., et al. Moreover, such compound motions depend on a synaptic integration that is generated from granule cell NMDA receptor activation and GABA-mediated inhibition. Eventually, the Golgi cells use an expanded axonal plexus to block broad fields of granule cells. The fundamental questions of whether dendritic processing underlies the theory-predicted spike-timing dependent plasticity (STDP) and how synaptic inputs govern the generation of Golgi cell spikes remain unanswered. It's interesting to note that dendrites express a diverse set of Ca, Na, and K ionic channels that may have an effect on dendritic computation, while mossy fiber–Golgi cell synapses express NMDA channels, which are essential for synaptic plasticity. Making a forecast regarding the potential interconnections between these many active features is challenging and necessitates a thorough computational examination of synaptic integration and the neuron's electrogenic architecture.

== Golgi type I ==
The cell bodies of Golgi type I neurons are medium-to-large. A Golgi type I neuron has a long axon that begins in the grey matter of the central nervous system and may extend from there. Their cell bodies were mostly multipolar, yet occasionally they might have been triangular in shape and lacking any appendages or spines. They possessed three to ten principal dendrites. There were no appendages or spines on these dendrites. The cells' dendrites had abundant arborizations.

These neurons have tufted and radiated branching patterns in their dendrites compared to the tufted pattern, the radiating branching pattern was more prevalent. The density of dendritic trees is typically present in these cells, but the quantity and diameter of primary dendrites are highly irregular. Outside the cell body, three to eleven dendrites are visible. Prior to splitting into tertiary branches, it quickly give rise to thinner secondary dendrites.

It is also known as a projection neuron. They include the neurons forming peripheral nerves and long tracts of brain and spinal cord. with somata usually ranging from 20 to 40μm. Golgi II neurons, in contrast, are defined as having short axons or no axon at all. This distinction was introduced by the pioneering neuroanatomist Camillo Golgi, on the basis of the appearance under a microscope of neurons stained with the Golgi stain that he had invented. Santiago Ramón y Cajal postulated that higher developed animals had more Golgi type II in comparison to Golgi type I neurons. These Golgi type II neurons have a star-like appearance, and are found in cerebral and cerebellar cortices and retina.

== Golgi type II ==
These neurons' cell bodies were ovoid, spheroid, or multipolar. A Golgi type II neuron either has no axon or else a short axon that does not send branches out of the gray matter of the central nervous system. Golgi type II dendrites have approximately symmetrical synaptic connections and have pale, asymmetric, and frequently massive profiles that contain huge pleomorphic vesicles. Golgi type II axon synaptic terminals may resemble dendritic endings, however many axonal endings seem to have narrower profiles with smaller, flatter vesicles. Their average diameter varied from 12 to 30 lm, with a mean of 22.2 lm on average (5.8 ± n = 120). Compared to Golgi type I neurons, Golgi type II neurons have a greater nucleus to cytoplasm ratio (N/C). Compared to Golgi type I neurons, these neurons' dendrites exhibit significantly less tufted dendrites. Two in the ten main dendrites protruded from the cell body and produced a small number of branches. Golgi type II neuron generates dendro-dendritic connections with the main neuron in terminal aggregates termed synaptic nests. Afferent axons descending from the auditory cortex and ascending from the posterior colliculus form synaptic connections with both kinds of neurons.

The Golgi type II cells might be excitatory or inhibitory interneurons, or they can be both. Golgi type II cells function as inhibitory interneurons, which could produce response patterns that make the primary neurons more responsive to the beginning of stimuli and to temporal variations in the afferent input. Golgi type II cells, being excitatory interneurons, have the ability to produce gradual or continuous response patterns that have the tendency to extend specific signal trains. In each scenario, the cortical analysis of sound locations and temporal patterns depends on the synaptic interactions between Golgi type II cells to define the spatial and temporal features of stimulus coding.

== See also ==
List of distinct cell types in the adult human body
