= Lugaro cell =

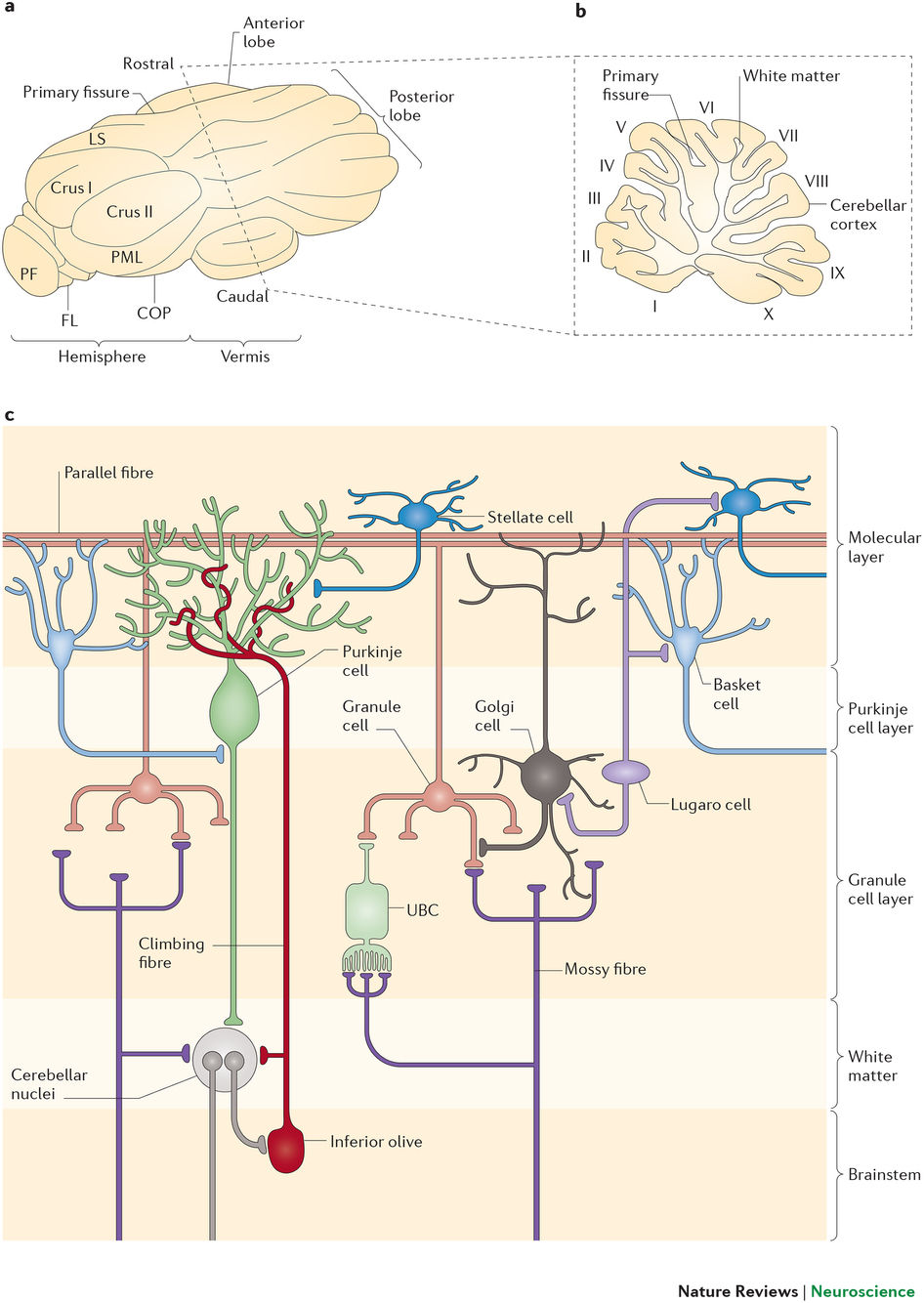
Classical view of cerebellar cytoarchitecture.

Lugaro cells are primary sensory interneurons of the cerebellum, that have an inhibitory function. They are fusiform, having a spindle shape that tapers at each end. They were first described by Ernesto Lugaro in the early 20th century. Lugaro cells are found just beneath the layer of Purkinje cells between the molecular layer and the granular layer. They have thick principal dendrites coming from opposite poles of their bodies. These dendrites are very long and travel along the boundary between the Purkinje layer and the granular layer. They seem to contact from 5 to 15 Purkinje cells in a horizontal direction. They can also sense stimuli close to the Purkinje cells and their dendrites form a large receptive area that monitors the environment near to the Purkinje cells. Whilst their dendrites make contact with the Purkinje cells they also receive inputs from branches of the Purkinje axons by which they seem to have a sampling and integration role.

The Lugaro cell has a major role in the cerebellum, interconnecting many neurons located in all layers of the cortex. It samples information from the Purkinje cell axon collaterals and forwards this information to the molecular and granular layers of the cerebellum. The axons of the Lugaro cells only contact inhibitory interneurons such as the basket, stellate and Golgi cells. The parallel axon targets stellate and basket cells and the transverse axon targets Golgi cells.

The Lugaro cell axon can sometimes take a curving detour through the granular layer, before running its parallel course in the molecular layer. The axon dips through the granular layer, into the white matter, before going up to terminate on basket or stellate cells in the molecular layer.

Sometimes the Lugaro cell axon will also terminate on Golgi cells in the granular layer without going on up again to the molecular layer, so that the Golgi cells are the target. According to Dieudonne, the Lugaro cell forms a major input to Golgi cells, and one Lugaro cell may contact up to 100 Golgi cells.

== See also ==
- Unipolar brush cell
- List of distinct cell types in the adult human body
