= Unipolar brush cell =

- Basic structure of the unipolar brush cell.

Details
- Location: Cerebellum
- Shape: Round body with single short dendrite "brush"
- Function: Excitatory interneuron
- Neurotransmitter: Glutamate
- Presynaptic connections: Vestibular ganglia and nuclei
- Postsynaptic connections: Granular layer

Identifiers
- NeuroLex ID: nifext_132

Unipolar brush cells (UBCs) are a class of excitatory glutamatergic interneuron found in the granular layer of the cerebellar cortex and also in the granule cell domain of the cochlear nucleus.

== Structure ==
The UBC has a round or oval cell body with usually a single short dendrite that ends in a brush-like tuft of short dendrioles (dendrites unique to UBCs). These brush dendrioles form very large synaptic junctions. The dendritic brush and the large endings of the axonal branches are involved in the formation of cerebellar glomeruli. The UBC has one short dendrite where the granule cell has four or five.

The brush dendrioles emit numerous, thin evaginations called filopodia, unique to UBCs. The filopodia emanate from all over the neuron, even including the dendritic stem and the cell body in some cells. Although UBC filopodia do not bear synaptic junctions, they are nevertheless involved in cell signaling.

== Function ==
UBCs are intrinsically firing neurons and considered as a class of excitatory "local circuit neurons". They work together with vestibular fibres to integrate signals involving the orientation of the head that modulates reflex behaviour. UBCs function to amplify inputs from the vestibular ganglia and nuclei by spreading and prolonging excitation within the granular layer. They receive glutamatergic inputs on its dendritic brush from a single mossy fibre terminal in the form of a giant glutamatergic synapse and make glutamatergic synapses with granule cells and other UBCs.

== Location ==
UBCs are plentiful in those regions linked to vestibular functions. In mammals, UBCs show an uneven distribution within the granule cell domains of the hindbrain, being the most dense in the vermis, part of the flocculus/paraflocculus complex, and layers 2–4 of the dorsal cochlear nucleus. In the rat cerebellum, UBCs outnumber Golgi cells by a factor of 3 and approximately equal the number of Purkinje cells. Like other glutamatergic cells of the cerebellum, UBCs originate in the rhombic lip.

== History ==
UBCs were first described in 1977 by Altman and Bayer, who called them "pale cells". The term "unipolar brush cell" was first introduced in the early 1990s, reclassifying pale cells, Rat-302 cells, monodendritic cells, chestnut cells and mitt cells under the same name. The Federative International Committee on Anatomical Terminology (FICAT), which is a subcommittee of the International Federation of Associations of Anatomists (IFAA), officially recognized the "unipolar brush cell" as a new cell type of the cerebellar cortex in 2008.

== Pathological significance ==
UBCs situated in cerebellar lobule VII are affected in some cases of Pick's disease, where they develop cytoskeletal anomalies and are recognized by antibodies to abnormally hyperphosphorylated tau proteins. UBCs have also been implicated in the dysfunction of balance and motor coordination present in Down syndrome.

== See also ==
List of distinct cell types in the adult human body
