= GCPC =

GCPC may refer to:

- Government Commercial Purchase Card, a government credit card for small purchases
- Greater Cairo Planning Commission
- Grain Crude Protein Concentration, the percent measure of protein found in grain foodstuffs
- Granule-cell-Purkinje-cell (gcPc)
