= Cartwheel =

Cartwheel or Cartwheels may refer to:

== Transport ==
- The wheel of a cart

== Gymnastics ==
- Cartwheel (gymnastics), an acrobatic maneuver
- Aerial cartwheel, an acrobatic move in which a cartwheel is executed without touching hands to the floor

== Business ==
- Cartwheel Books, an imprint of Scholastic Corporation
- Cartwheel Records, a former record label based in Nashville, Tennessee
- Target Cartwheel, a savings app from Target Corporation

== Currency ==
- Cartwheel, nickname for some Hanoverian-era British coins
- Cartwheel, slang term for a silver dollar coin (United States)

== Music ==
- Cartwheel (album), a 2023 album by Hotline TNT
- Cartwheels, a 1995 album by Anthony Thistlethwaite
- Cartwheels, a 2014 EP by Frenchy and the Punk
- Cartwheels, a 2016 album by Ward Thomas

== Other uses ==
- Cartwheel cell, a type of neuron
- Cartwheel Galaxy
- Cartwheel hat, worn by women
- Operation Cartwheel, a major military strategy for the Allies in the Pacific theater of World War II
