= Cartwheel cell =

Cartwheel cells are neurons of the dorsal cochlear nucleus (DCN) where they greatly outnumber the other inhibitory interneurons of the DCN. Their somas lie on the superficial side of the pyramidal layer of the DCN, and their dendrites receive input from the parallel fibres of the granule cell layer. Their axons do not extend beyond the dorsal cochlear nucleus but synapse with other cartwheel cells and pyramidal cells within the DCN releasing GABA and glycine onto their targets.

Cartwheel cells have similar spiking patterns to Purkinje cells, firing complex spike bursts as well as simple spikes. They are also seen to share other features common to the cerebellar Purkinje cells. Other data supports the structural and functional similarity found between the cartwheel and the Purkinje neuron. Cartwheel cells are shown to have a high density of spines on their dendrites, their axons are myelinated, they are of spherical cell shape and of medium size. The primary targets of the cartwheel cells are the large efferent pyramidal neurons of the DCN, found in layer two. Data retrieved has shown that this targeting of the pyramidal cells modulates their activity and therefore plays a key role in the shaping of the overall output of the superficial layers of the dorsal cochlear nucleus.

== See also ==
List of distinct cell types in the adult human body
