= Spino-olivary tract =

- Spinal cord tracts, spino-olivary tract shown at lower right

Details

Identifiers
- Latin: tractus spinoolivaris
- NeuroLex ID: birnlex_1484
- TA98: A14.1.02.230; A14.1.04.117; A14.1.04.145
- TA2: 6109
- FMA: 72643

The spino-olivary tract (historically Helweg's tract) is located in the anterior funiculus of the spinal cord and provides transmission of unconscious proprioception and is involved in balance. This tract carries proprioception information from muscles and tendons as well as cutaneous impulses to the inferior olivary nuclei, located in the olivary bodies, also known as the olives. The olivary bodies are located in the medulla oblongata in the brainstem. Other tracts that carry proprioception are the DSCT, cuneocerebellar tract, dorsal column–medial lemniscus pathway, and the VSCT.

The spino-olivary tract is a non-specific indirect ascending pathway and is connected to the inferior olivary nuclei. The axons enter the spinal cord from the dorsal root ganglia and terminate on unknown second-order neurons in the posterior grey column. The axons from the second-order neurons cross the midline and ascend as the spino-olivary tract in the white matter at the junction of the anterior and lateral columns. The axons end by synapsing on third-order neurons in the inferior olivary nuclei in the medulla oblongata. The axons of the third-order neurons cross the midline and enter the cerebellum through the inferior cerebellar peduncle.

The spino-olivary tract conveys information to the cerebellum from cutaneous and proprioceptive organs. Sensations are from the ipsilateral side as the fibres cross twice – once at the level of axons of second-order neurons and again at the level of axons of third-order neurons.
