= Granule-cell–Purkinje-cell synapse =

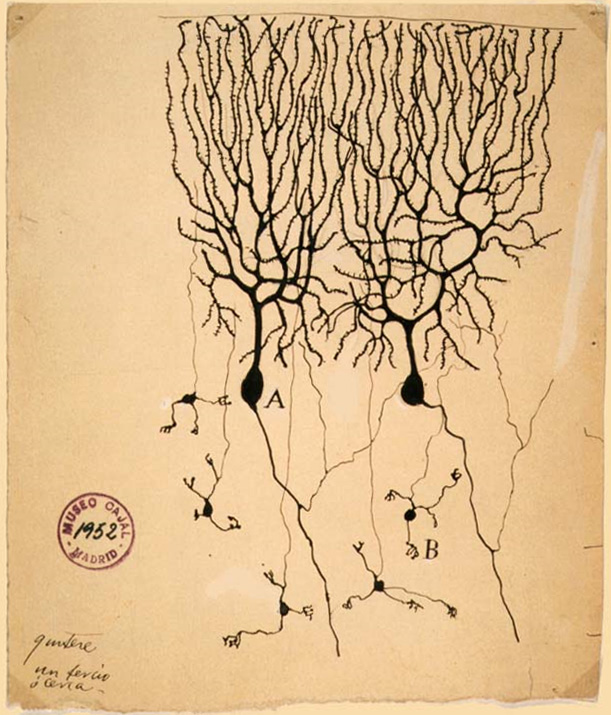
Purkinje cells (A) and granule cells (B) from a pigeon cerebellum

Granule-cell to Purkinje-cell synapses or gcPc synapses are the junctions that form the synapse in the cerebellum between granule cells and Purkinje cells. These synapses are thought to be a storage site for the information that is required for motor coordination and their misfunctioning is involved with some movement disorders. Glutamate is the neurotransmitter.
