= Decerebellate =

Brain disorder

Decerebellate rigidity is caused by a lesion in the cerebellum. The function of the cerebellum is to coordinate muscular activity. Animals with decerebellate rigidity show opisthotonus with thoracic limb extension, flexion of the pelvic limbs rigidly extended. Mentation of decerebellate animals is generally adequate.
