= Cerebellar agenesis =

Brain development disorder

Cerebellar agenesis

Cerebellar agenesis is a rare condition in which a brain develops without the cerebellum. The cerebellum controls smooth movement, and when it does not develop, the rest of the brain must compensate, which it cannot do completely. The condition is not fatal on its own, but people born without a cerebellum experience severe developmental delays, language deficits, and neurological abnormalities. As children with cerebellar agenesis get older, their movements usually improve. It can co-exist with other severe malformations of the central nervous system, like anencephaly, holoprosencephaly, and microencephaly.

The condition was first reported in 1831. Ten cases had been reported as of 1998. Agenesis of one half or another part of the cerebellum is more common than complete agenesis.

Cerebellar agenesis can be caused by mutations in the PTF1A gene.
