= Glomerulus (cerebellum) =

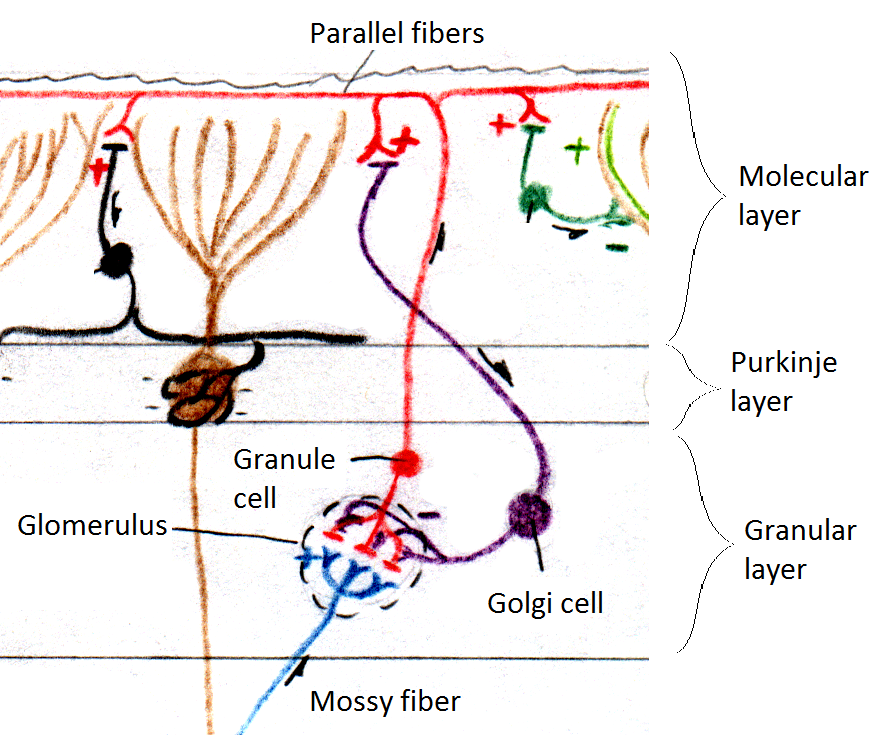
The glomerulus in the granular layer of the cerebellum

The cerebellar glomerulus is a small, intertwined mass of nerve fiber terminals in the granular layer of the cerebellar cortex. It consists of post-synaptic granule cell dendrites and pre-synaptic terminals of mossy fibers.

== Function ==
The cerebellar glomeruli are the first "processing station" for afferent nerve fibers entering the cerebellum. Input comes from the mossy fibers, which terminate there and synapse with the Golgi and granule cell fibers. The Golgi cells regulate the glomeruli with inhibitory signals, while information is passed on to the granule and Golgi cells from the mossy fiber.

== Structure ==
A cerebellar glomerulus is about 2.5 um in diameter, and is wrapped by glial sheathing. Glomeruli are centered on the large axonal terminals of glutamatergic afferent mossy fibers. Each terminal comes into contact with dendrites from 50 to 60 different granule cells. The granule cells themselves each have a single or multiple dendrites, and each participates in a different glomerulus. Glomeruli also contain the GABAergic (inhibitory) synapses of Golgi cells onto granule cells, and the glutamatergic (excitatory) synapses from mossy fibers onto Golgi cells. Each glomerulus contains approximately 50 granule cell dendrites, 210 total dendritic digits and 230 synaptic junctions.

== Velate astrocytes ==
Velate astrocytes are glia that sheath the glomeruli. They are protoplasmic astrocytes with extremely thin veil-like processes that spread out and overlap each other. Researchers Sanford Palay and Victoria Chan-Palay noted that the sheath does not penetrate into the deeper part of the glomeruli or come into contact with the mossy fiber. Instead it forms a capsule, through which the neural processes of the granule and Golgi cells penetrate. The purpose of the glial sheath is still unknown, though multiple functions have been proposed, including structural support, electrophysiological insulation, and chemical equilibrium maintenance in the interstitial fluid, while creating a chemical barrier to the further outgrowth of granule and Golgi cell fibers. Research conducted by David Eagleman suggests that the glial sheath limits the supply of extracellular calcium to regulate signaling.
