= Climbing fiber =

Structure in the brain

- Microcircuitry of the cerebellum. Excitatory synapses are denoted by (+) and inhibitory synapses by (-). Climbing fiber is shown originating from the inferior olive (green).

Details
- Location: Inferior olive and Cerebellum
- Shape: Unique projection neuron (see text)
- Function: Unique excitatory function (see text)
- Neurotransmitter: Glutamate
- Presynaptic connections: Inferior olive
- Postsynaptic connections: Purkinje cells

Climbing fibers are the name given to a series of neuronal projections from the inferior olivary nucleus located in the medulla oblongata.

These axons pass through the pons and enter the cerebellum via the inferior cerebellar peduncle where they form synapses with the deep cerebellar nuclei and Purkinje cells. Each climbing fiber will form synapses with 1-10 Purkinje cells.

Early in development, Purkinje cells are innervated by multiple climbing fibers, but as the cerebellum matures, these inputs gradually become eliminated resulting in a single climbing fiber input per Purkinje cell.

These fibers provide very powerful, excitatory input to the cerebellum which results in the generation of complex spike excitatory postsynaptic potential (EPSP) in Purkinje cells. In this way climbing fibers (CFs) perform a central role in motor behaviors.

The climbing fibers carry information from various sources such as the spinal cord, vestibular system, red nucleus, superior colliculus, reticular formation and sensory and motor cortices. Climbing fiber activation is thought to serve as a motor error signal sent to the cerebellum, and is an important signal for motor timing. In addition to the control and coordination of movements, the climbing fiber afferent system contributes to sensory processing and cognitive tasks likely by encoding the timing of sensory input independently of attention or awareness.

In the central nervous system, these fibers are able to undergo remarkable regenerative modifications in response to injuries, being able to generate new branches by sprouting to innervate surrounding Purkinje cells if these lose their CF innervation. This kind of injury-induced sprouting has been shown to need the growth associated protein GAP-43.

== See also ==
- Axon terminals
- Parallel fiber
