= Mossy fiber (cerebellum) =

Major input to cerebellum

Microcircuitry of the cerebellum. Excitatory synapses are denoted by (+) and inhibitory synapses by (-). MF: Mossy fiber. DCN: Deep cerebellar nuclei. IO: Inferior olive. CF: Climbing fiber. GC: Granule cell. PF: Parallel fiber. PC: Purkinje cell. GgC: Golgi cell. SC: Stellate cell. BC: Basket cell.

Mossy fibers are one of the major inputs to cerebellum. There are many sources of this pathway, the largest of which is the cerebral cortex, which sends input to the cerebellum via the pontocerebellar pathway. Other contributors include the vestibular nerve and nuclei, the spinal cord, the reticular formation, and feedback from deep cerebellar nuclei. Axons enter the cerebellum via the middle and inferior cerebellar peduncles, where some branch to make contact with deep cerebellar nuclei. They ascend into the white matter of the cerebellum, where each axon branches to innervate granule cells in several cerebellar folia.

In this case, the pathway is so named for a unique synapse formed by its projections, the mossy fiber rosette. Fine branches of the mossy fiber axons twist through the granule cell layer, and slight enlargements giving a knotted appearance indicate synaptic contacts. These contacts have the appearance of a classic Gray's type 1 synapse, indicating they are glutamatergic and excitatory. Sensory information relayed from the pons through the mossy fibers to the granule cells is then sent along the parallel fibers to the Purkinje cells for processing. Extensive branching in white matter and synapses to granular cells ensures that input from a single mossy fiber axon will influence processing in a very large number of Purkinje cells.

== See also ==
- Climbing fiber
- Mossy fiber (hippocampus), which shares little similarity with its cerebellar namesake.
