= Excitatory synapse =

Type of synapse

The process of bridging the synaptic gap between neurons.

An excitatory synapse is a synapse in which an action potential in a presynaptic neuron depolarizes the membrane of the postsynaptic cell, and thus increases the probability of triggering an action potential in that cell. The postsynaptic cell—a muscle cell, a glandular cell or another neuron—typically receives input signals through many excitatory and many inhibitory synapses. If the total of excitatory influences exceeds that of the inhibitory influences and the resulting depolarization exceeds the threshold level, the postsynaptic cell will be activated. If the postsynaptic cell is a neuron it will generate a new action potential at its axon hillock, thus transmitting the information to yet another cell. If it is a muscle cell, it will contract. If it is a gland cell, it will release its product (e.g., hormone).

A diagram of a typical central nervous system synapse. The spheres located in the upper neuron contain neurotransmitters that fuse with the presynaptic membrane and release neurotransmitters into the synaptic cleft. These neurotransmitters bind to receptors located on the postsynaptic membrane of the lower neuron, and, in the case of an excitatory synapse, may lead to a depolarization of the postsynaptic cell.

In an excitatory synapse, the electric response of the postsynaptic membrane to a single action potential in the presynaptic neuron is known as an excitatory postsynaptic potential (EPSP). It may occur via direct contact between cells (i.e., via gap junctions), as in an electrical synapse, but most commonly occurs via the vesicular release of neurotransmitters from the presynaptic axon terminal into the synaptic cleft, as in a chemical synapse.

The excitatory neurotransmitters, the most common of which is glutamate, then migrate via diffusion to the dendritic spine of the postsynaptic neuron and bind a specific transmembrane receptor protein that triggers the depolarization of that cell. Depolarization, a deviation from a neuron's resting membrane potential towards its threshold potential, increases the likelihood of an action potential and normally occurs with the influx of positively charged sodium (Na^{+}) ions into the postsynaptic cell through ion channels activated by neurotransmitter binding.

== Chemical vs electrical synapses ==
Animation showing the function of a chemical synapse.

There are two different kinds of synapses present within the human brain: chemical and electrical. Chemical synapses are by far the most prevalent and are the main player involved in excitatory synapses. Electrical synapses, the minority, allow direct, passive flow of electric current through special intercellular connections called gap junctions. These gap junctions allow for virtually instantaneous transmission of electrical signals through direct passive flow of ions between neurons (transmission can be bidirectional). The main goal of electrical synapses is to synchronize electrical activity among populations of neurons. The first electrical synapse was discovered in a crayfish nervous system.

Chemical synaptic transmission is the transfer of neurotransmitters or neuropeptides from a presynaptic axon to a postsynaptic dendrite. Unlike an electrical synapse, the chemical synapses are separated by a space called the synaptic cleft, typically measured between 15 and 25 nm. Transmission of an excitatory signal involves several steps outlined below.

== Synaptic transmission ==
1. In neurons that are involved in chemical synaptic transmission, neurotransmitters are synthesized either in the neuronal cell body, or within the presynaptic terminal, depending on the type of neurotransmitter being synthesized and the location of enzymes involved in its synthesis. These neurotransmitters are stored in synaptic vesicles that remain bound near the membrane by calcium-influenced proteins.
2. In order to trigger the process of chemical synaptic transmission, upstream activity causes an action potential to invade the presynaptic terminal.
3. This depolarizing current reaches the presynaptic terminal, and the membrane depolarization that it causes there initiates the opening of voltage-gated calcium channels present on the presynaptic membrane.
4. There is high concentration of calcium in the synaptic cleft between the two participating neurons (presynaptic and postsynaptic). This difference in calcium concentration between the synaptic cleft and the inside of the presynaptic terminal establishes a strong concentration gradient that drives the calcium into the presynaptic terminal upon opening of these voltage-gated calcium channels. This influx of calcium into the presynaptic terminal is necessary for neurotransmitter release.
5. After entering the presynaptic terminal, the calcium binds a protein called synaptotagmin, which is located on the membrane of the synaptic vesicles. This protein interacts with other proteins called SNAREs in order to induce vesicle fusion with the presynaptic membrane. As a result of this vesicle fusion, the neurotransmitters that had been packaged into the synaptic vesicle are released into the synapse, where they diffuse across the synaptic cleft.
6. These neurotransmitters bind to a variety of receptors on the postsynaptic cell membrane. In response to neurotransmitter binding, these postsynaptic receptors can undergo conformational changes that may open a transmembrane channel subunit either directly, or indirectly via a G-Protein signaling pathway. The selective permeability of these channels allow certain ions to move along their electrochemical gradients, inducing a current across the postsynaptic membrane that determines an excitatory or inhibitory response.

== Responses of the postsynaptic neuron ==
When neurotransmitters reach the postsynaptic neuron of an excitatory synapse, these molecules can bind to two possible types of receptors that are clustered in a protein-rich portion of the postsynaptic cytoskeleton called the Postsynaptic density (PSD). Ionotropic receptors, which are also referred to as ligand-gated ion channels, contain a transmembrane domain that acts as an ion channel and can directly open after binding of a neurotransmitter. Metabotropic receptors, which are also called G-protein-coupled receptors, act on an ion channel through the intracellular signaling of a molecule called a G protein. Each of these channels has a specific reversal potential, E_{rev}, and each receptor is selectively permeable to particular ions that flow either into or out of the cell in order to bring the overall membrane potential to this reversal potential. If a neurotransmitter binds to a receptor with a reversal potential that is higher than the threshold potential for the postsynaptic neuron, the postsynaptic cell will be more likely to generate an action potential and an excitatory postsynaptic potential will occur (EPSP). On the other hand, if the reversal potential of the receptor to which the neurotransmitter binds is lower than the threshold potential, an inhibitory postsynaptic potential will occur (IPSP).

Although the receptors at an excitatory synapse strive to bring the membrane potential towards their own specific E_{rev}, the probability that the single stimulation of an excitatory synapse will raise the membrane potential past threshold and produce an action potential is not very high. Therefore, in order to achieve threshold and generate an action potential, the postsynaptic neuron has the capacity to add up all of the incoming EPSPs based on the mechanism of summation, which can occur in time and space. Temporal summation occurs when a particular synapse is stimulated at a high frequency, which causes the postsynaptic neuron to sum the incoming EPSPs and thus increases the chance of the neuron firing an action potential. In a similar way, the postsynaptic neuron can sum together EPSPs from multiple synapses with other neurons in a process called spatial summation.

== Types of excitatory neurotransmitters ==
=== Acetylcholine ===
Acetylcholine (ACh) is an excitatory, small-molecule neurotransmitter involved in synaptic transmission at neuromuscular junctions controlling the vagus nerve and cardiac muscle fibers, as well as in the skeletal and visceral motor systems and various sites within the central nervous system. This neurotransmitter crosses the synaptic cleft and binds to a variety of postsynaptic receptors depending on the species, but all of these receptors depolarize the postsynaptic membrane and thus classify ACh as an excitatory neurotransmitter.

=== Glutamate ===
Glutamate is a small, amino acid neurotransmitter, and is the primary excitatory neurotransmitter at almost all synapses in the central nervous system. This molecule binds multiple postsynaptic receptors including the NMDA receptor, AMPA receptor, and kainate receptors. These receptors are all cation channels that allow positively charged ions such as Na^{+}, K^{+}, and sometimes Ca^{2+} into the postsynaptic cell, causing a depolarization that excites the neuron.

=== Catecholamines ===
The catecholamines, which include Epinephrine, Norepinephrine, and Dopamine, are excitatory biogenic amine neuromodulators that are derived from the amino acid tyrosine and serve as excitatory neurotransmitters at various locations in the central nervous system as well as the peripheral nervous system. Epinephrine and norepinephrine, also called adrenaline and noradrenaline, respectively, bind a number of G-protein-coupled receptors that induce their depolarizing effects on the postsynaptic cell in various ways, including activating and inactivating certain K^{+} channels. Epinephrine is found in the lateral tegmental system, medulla, hypothalamus, and thalamus of the central nervous system, but their function is not fully understood. Norepinephrine is found in the brain stem and is involved in sleep and wakefulness, feeding behavior, and attention. Dopamine binds to G-protein-coupled receptors in many areas of the brain, especially the corpus striatum where it mediates the synaptic transmission that underlies the coordination of body movements.

=== Serotonin ===
Serotonin is an excitatory neurotransmitter that regulates sleep and wakefulness and is found in neurons of the raphe region of the pons and upper brain stem, which extend into the forebrain. Serotonin binds a number of receptors, including the 5-HT_{3} receptors, which are ligand-gated ion channels that allow the passage of cations in order to depolarize the membrane potential of the postsynaptic neuron that they reside on. Levels of serotonin activity that are lower than normal have been linked to a variety of symptoms, especially depression, which is why many antidepressant drugs act to increase serotonin activity.

=== Histamine ===
Histamine acts as an excitatory neurotransmitter by binding G-protein coupled receptors in neurons of the hypothalamus. These neurons project into many regions of the brain and spinal cord, allowing histamine to mediate attention, arousal, and allergic responses. Of the four types of histamine receptors (H_{1} - H_{4}), H_{3} is found in the central nervous system and is responsible for regulating histamine effects on neurotransmission.

== Disease ==
Excitatory synapses have a fundamental role in information processing within the brain and throughout the peripheral nervous system. Usually situated on dendritic spines, or neuronal membrane protrusions on which glutamate receptors and postsynaptic density components are concentrated, excitatory synapses aid in the electrical transmission of neuronal signals. The physical morphology of synapses is crucial in understanding their function, and it is well documented that the inappropriate loss of synaptic stability leads to the disruption of neuronal circuits and the resulting neurological diseases. Although there are innumerable different causes for different neurodegenerative illnesses, such as genetic dispositions or mutations, the normal aging process, parasitic and viral causes, or drug use, many can be traced back to dysfunctional signaling between the neurons themselves, often at the synapse.

=== Excitotoxicity ===
==== Pathophysiology ====
Since glutamate is the most common excitatory neurotransmitter involved in synaptic neuronal transmission, it follows that disruptions in the normal functioning of these pathways can have severe detrimental effects on the nervous system. A major source of cellular stress is related to glutaminergic overstimulation of a postsynaptic neuron via excessive activation of glutamate receptors (i.e., NMDA and AMPA receptors), a process known as excitotoxicity, which was first discovered accidentally by D. R. Lucas and J. P. Newhouse in 1957 during experimentation on sodium-fed lab mice.

Under normal conditions, extracellular glutamate levels are held under strict control by surrounding neuronal and glial cell membrane transporters, rising to a concentration of about 1 mM and quickly falling to resting levels. These levels are maintained via the recycling of glutamate molecules in the neuronal-glial cell process known as the glutamate–glutamine cycle, in which glutamate is synthesized from its precursor glutamine in a controlled manner in order to maintain an adequate supply of the neurotransmitter. However, when glutamate molecules in the synaptic cleft cannot be degraded or reused, often due to dysfunction of the glutamate–glutamine cycle, the neuron becomes significantly overstimulated, leading to a neuronal cell death pathway known as apoptosis. Apoptosis occurs primarily via the increased intracellular concentrations of calcium ions, which flow into the cytosol through the activated glutamate receptors and lead to the activation of phospholipases, endonucleases, proteases, and thus the apoptotic cascade. Additional sources of neuronal cell death related to excitotoxicity involve energy rundown in the mitochondria and increased concentrations of reactive oxygen and nitrogen species within the cell.

==== Treatment ====
Excitotoxic mechanisms are often involved in other conditions leading to neuronal damage, including hypoglycemia, trauma, stroke, seizures, and many neurodegenerative diseases, and thus have important implications in disease treatment. Recent studies have been performed that incorporate glutamate receptor antagonists and excitotoxic cascade disruptors in order to decrease stimulation of postsynaptic neurons, although these treatments are still undergoing active research.

=== Related neurodegenerative diseases ===
Alzheimer's disease (AD) is the most common form of neurodegenerative dementia, or loss of brain function, and was first described by German psychiatrist and neuropathologist Alois Alzheimer in 1907. 9. Diagnosis of the disease often stems from clinical observation as well as analysis of family history and other risk factors, and often includes symptoms such as memory impairment and problems with language, decision-making, judgment, and personality. The primary neurological phenomena that lead to the above symptoms are often related to signaling at excitatory synapses, often due to excitotoxicity, and stem from the presence of amyloid plaques and neurofibrillary tangles, as well as neuronal cell death and synaptic pruning. The principle drug treatments on the market deal with antagonizing glutamate (NMDA) receptors at neuronal synapses, and inhibiting the activity of acetylcholinesterase. This treatment aims to limit the apoptosis of cerebral neurons caused by various pathways related to excitotoxicity, free radicals, and energy rundown. A number of labs are currently focusing on the prevention of amyloid plaques and other AD symptoms, often via the use of experimental vaccines, although this area of research is yet in its infancy.

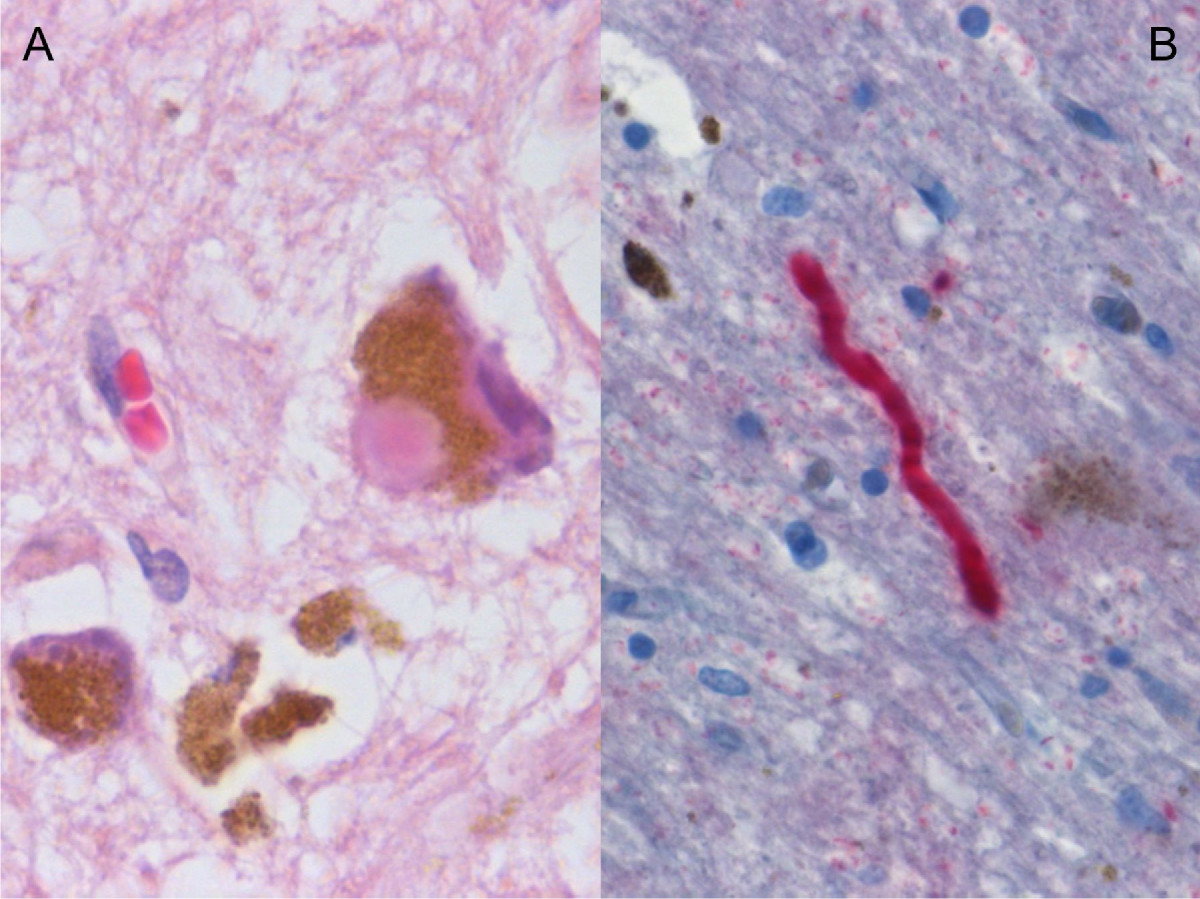
Histological brain sample of the Substantia Nigra in Parkinson's disease, showing the presence of Lewy bodies and other signs of neurodegeneration.

Parkinson's disease (PD) is a neurodegenerative disease resulting from the apoptosis of dopaminergic neurons in the central nervous system, especially the substantia nigra, as well as heightened response to the excitatory neurotransmitter, glutamate (i.e., excitotoxicity). While the most obvious symptoms are related to motor skills, prolonged progression of the disease can lead to cognitive and behavioral problems as well as dementia. Although the mechanism of apoptosis in the brain is not entirely clear, speculation associates cell death with abnormal accumulation of ubiquitinated proteins in cell occlusions known as Lewy bodies, as well as hyperstimulation of neuronal NMDA receptors with excessive glutamate neurotransmitter via the aforementioned pathway. Like Alzheimer's, Parkinson's Disease lacks a cure. Therefore, in addition to lifestyle changes and surgery, the goal of pharmaceutical drugs used in the treatment of PD patients is to control symptoms and limit, when possible, the progression of the disease. Levodopa (L-DOPA), the most widely used treatment of PD, is converted to dopamine in the body and helps to relieve the effect of decreased dopaminergic neurons in the central nervous system. Other dopamine agonists have been administered to patients in an effort to mimic dopamine’s effect at excitatory synapses, binding its receptors and causing the desired postsynaptic response.

== See also ==
- Inhibitory synapse
- Neurotransmission
- Neuroscience
- Synaptogenesis
- Electrophysiology
- Neurotoxicity
