= Wobbler disease =

Malformations of the cervical vertebrae in dogs and horses

Wobbler disease is a catchall term referring to several possible malformations of the cervical vertebrae that cause an unsteady (wobbly) gait and weakness in dogs and horses. A number of different conditions of the cervical (neck) spinal column cause similar clinical signs. These conditions may include malformation of the vertebrae, intervertebral disc protrusion, and disease of the interspinal ligaments, ligamenta flava, and articular facets of the vertebrae. Wobbler disease is also known as cervical vertebral instability (CVI), cervical spondylomyelopathy (CSM), and cervical vertebral malformation (CVM). In dogs, the disease is most common in large breeds, especially Great Danes and Doberman Pinschers. In horses, it is not linked to a particular breed, though it is most often seen in tall, race-bred horses of Thoroughbred or Standardbred ancestry. It is most likely inherited to at least some extent in dogs and horses.

== Wobbler disease in dogs ==
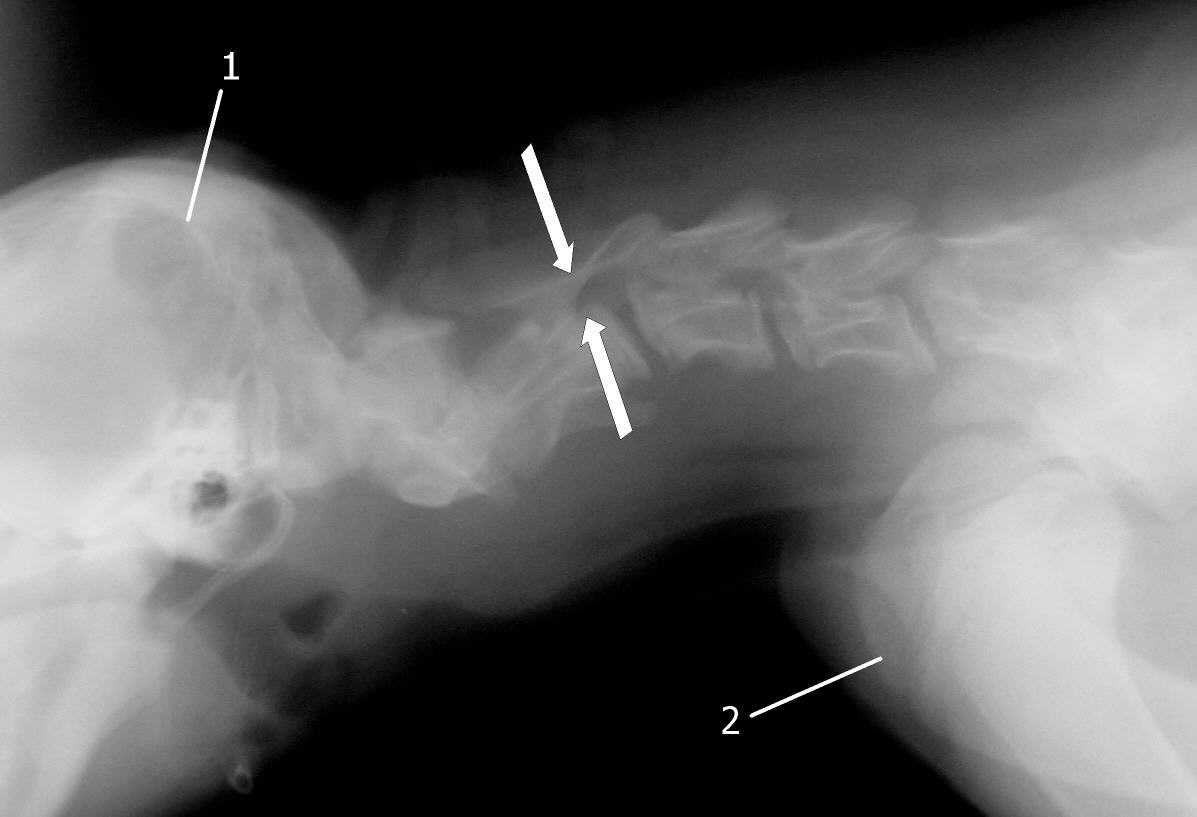
X-ray of wobbler disease in a dog

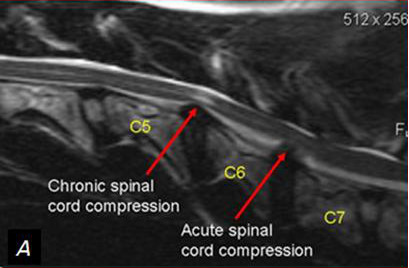
Doberman C6-C7 and C5-C6 traction responsive myelopathy A

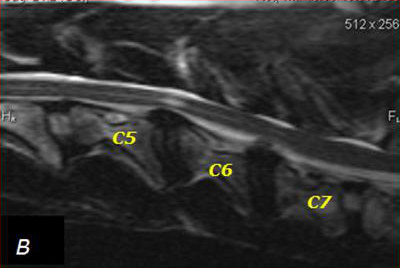
Doberman C6-C7 and C5-C6 traction responsive myelopathy B

T2 weighted MRI in neutral (A) and linear traction (B) of a seven-year-old Doberman with a two-year history of cervical pain treated with NSAIDs and presented acutely tetraplegic: A C6-C7 and C5-C6 traction responsive myelopathy are evident on MRI. The spinal-cord hyperintensity seen at the C5-C6 is suggestive of chronic lesion and most likely responsible for the chronic history of cervical pain, while the C5-C6 lesion was most likely responsible for the acute tetraplegia.

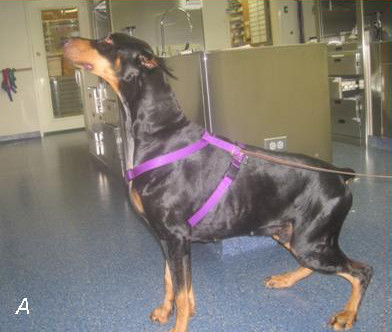
Doberman post surgery following double implant A

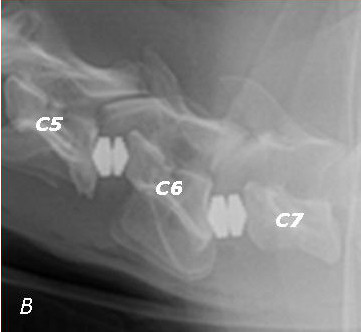
Doberman post surgery following double implant B

Same dog (A) treated with double implant (B) three days after surgery: The dog became ambulatory three days after surgery. Four weeks after surgery, it had ataxia without conscious proprioceptive deficits, and three months after surgery, the dog was neurologically normal. The owner reported it had been two years since the dog was able to hold its neck in an elevated position.

Wobbler disease is probably inherited in the Borzoi, Great Dane, Doberman, and Basset Hound. Instability of the vertebrae of the neck (usually the caudal neck) causes spinal cord compression. In younger dogs such as Great Danes less than two years of age, wobbler disease is caused by stenosis (narrowing) of the vertebral canal related to degeneration of the dorsal articular facets and subsequent thickening of the associated joint capsules and ligaments. A high-protein diet may contribute to its development. In middle-aged and older dogs such as Dobermans, intervertebral disc disease leads to bulging of the disc or herniation of the disc contents, and the spinal cord is compressed. In Great Danes, the C_{4} to C_{6} vertebrae are most commonly affected; in Dobermans, the C_{5} to C_{7} vertebrae are affected.

The disease tends to be gradually progressive. Symptoms such as weakness, ataxia, and dragging of the toes start in the rear legs. Dogs often have a crouching stance with a downward flexed neck. The disease progresses to the front legs, but the symptoms are less severe. Neck pain is sometimes seen. Symptoms are usually gradual in onset, but may progress rapidly following trauma. X-rays may show misaligned vertebrae and narrow disk spaces, but it is not as effective as a myelogram, which reveals stenosis of the vertebral canal. Magnetic resonance imaging has been shown to be more effective at showing the location, nature, and severity of spinal cord compression than a myelogram. Treatment is either medical to control the symptoms, usually with corticosteroids and cage rest, or surgical to correct the spinal cord compression. The prognosis is guarded in either case. Surgery may fully correct the problem, but it is technically difficult and relapses may occur. Types of surgery include ventral decompression of the spinal cord (ventral slot technique), dorsal decompression, and vertebral stabilization. One study showed no significant advantage to any of the common spinal cord decompression procedures. Another study showed that electroacupuncture may be a successful treatment for Wobbler disease. A new surgical treatment using a proprietary medical device has been developed for dogs with disc-associated wobbler disease. It implants an artificial disc (cervical arthroplasty) in place of the affected disc space.

=== Commonly affected dog breeds ===
- Great Dane
- Doberman
- St. Bernard
- Weimaraner
- German Shepherd Dog
- Boxer
- Basset Hound
- Rhodesian Ridgeback
- Dalmatian
- Samoyed
- Old English Sheepdog
- Bull Mastiff
- Newfoundland
- Greyhound
- Rottweiler

== Wobbler disease in horses ==
Wobbler disease or wobbler's syndrome is a broad category of cervical disorders in the horse, including the conditions listed above, as well as equine wobbles anemia and cervical vertebral myelopathy, spinal cord compression (sometimes referred to colloquially among horse owners as "cervical arthritis" due to the arthritis that accumulates in facets). Within the horse community, any neurological problem that causes limb proprioception issues or decreased performance in the horse that is suspected to be rooted in the neck is considered a type of wobbler disease. Most forms of wobbler disease have a root cause in cervical vertebral myelopathy (CVM), which causes inflammation and arthritis in the joint and is painful to affected horses. At this time it is believed to possibly be a congenital condition. Mounting evidence is growing that points to CVM and other cervical and vertebral disorders (like Kissing Spine) as hereditary and found in populations of specific families.

Other forms, such as cervical arthritis and equine wobbles anemia, are concentrated in certain breeds and demonstrate possible hereditary factors. Horses with wobbler disease often exhibit ataxia (implying dysfunction of parts of the nervous system), show weakness in the hindquarters, or may knuckle over in their fetlocks, particularly in the rear. They also may show overall stiffness especially in the neck and back and may not move fluidly. A common ataxic symptom is the horse will list to one side behind. They also may demonstrate uneven strides with one leg intermittently shorter in step. Horses with wobbler disease or cervical anomalies can demonstrate difficult to diagnose lamenesses that come and go, and often are not resolved by veterinary blocks to the limbs. With advanced stages of the disease, affected horses are prone to falling due to extreme listing behind and often demonstrate difficulty getting up from lying down, or reluctance to lie down at all. While some cases are successfully treated with nutritional and medical management, surgery is also used. One method is the use of titanium baskets, placed to fuse the vertebrae, thereby preventing compression of the spinal cord. Some horses are able to return to work, with a few able to reach competitive levels. No complete cure for the condition is known. Famous horses known to have completed basket surgery include Seattle Slew. Seattle Slew underwent two basket surgeries and has sired multiple offspring that have cervical arthritis. He is one of many Thoroughbred stallions to have undergone basket surgery and still be used for stud.

Because wobbler disease is the best known of the neurological conditions that affect horses, other, unrelated conditions, such as kissing spine, equine protozoal myeloencephalitis and cerebellar abiotrophy, are sometimes misdiagnosed as wobbler disease, though the causes and symptoms differ.

=== Clinical presentation ===
Including the symptoms listed above, clinical presentations of "wobblers" can also include neck pain and stiffness, difficulty tracking up or gait abnormalities, decreased performance, intermittent or swapping lameness particularly in diagonal pairs, forelimb lameness, abnormal head and neck posture, defensiveness or change in behavior, and abnormal sweat patterns.

=== Diagnosis ===
Wobbler disease is definitively diagnosed by x-ray, nuclear scintigraphy or bone scan. X-rays will show channel widening or filling the easiest and are often most cost-effective to horse owners. X-rays will also show any structural anomaly, arthritis, facet remodeling, or bone spurs present. Preliminary diagnosis can be made by ultrasound but x-rays are needed to measure the true depth of facet involvement. For extent of damage to associated structures, veterinarians may opt to have the horse undergo a bone scan or nuclear scintigraphy.

=== Commonly affected horse breeds ===
- Warmblood
- Standardbred
- American Quarter Horse
- American Paint Horse
- Thoroughbred
