= Ponazuril =

Chemical compound

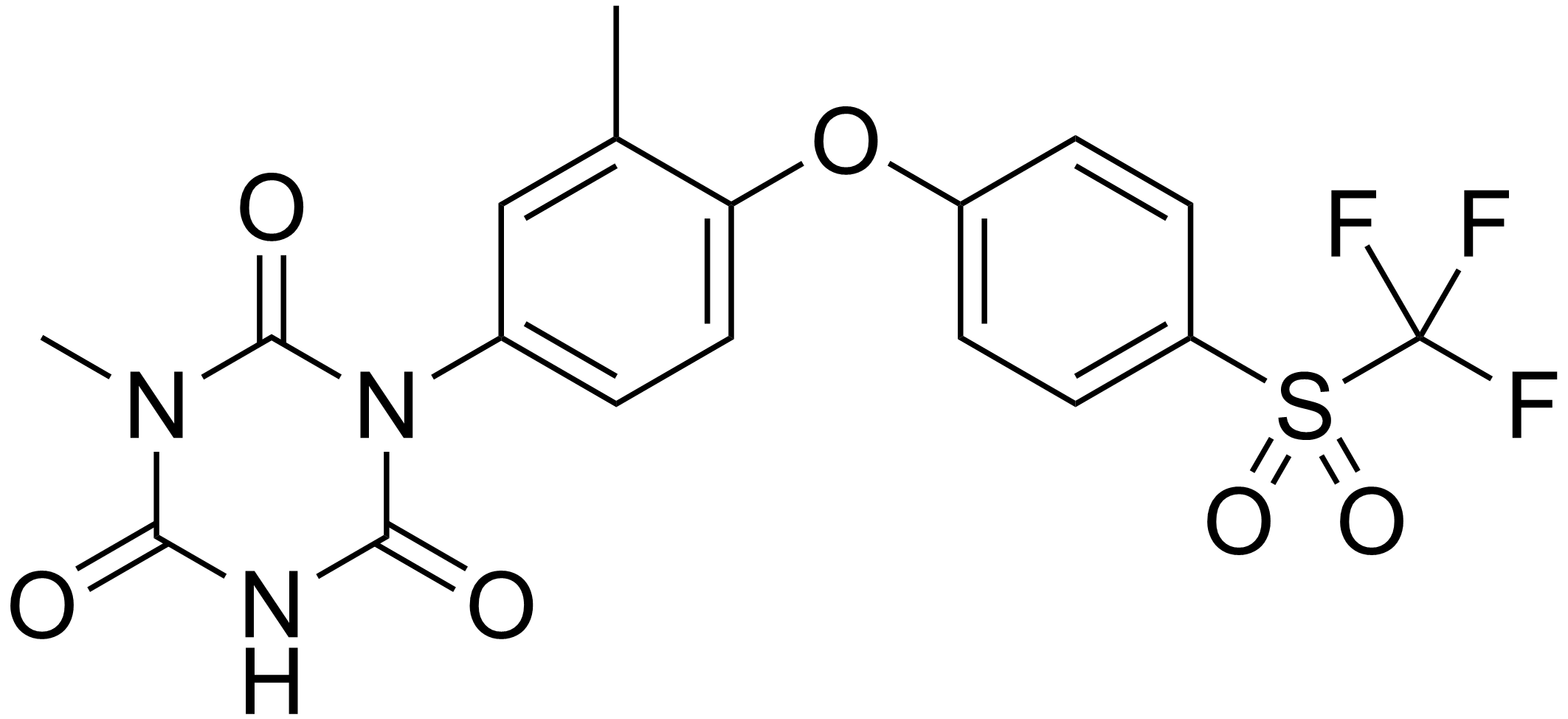

Clinical data
- Trade names: Marquis
- Other names: ACD855; ACD-855
- AHFS/Drugs.com: FDA Professional Drug Information
- Routes of administration: Oral
- ATCvet code: QP51BC04 (WHO)

Legal status
- Legal status: US: ℞-only; Veterinary use only

Identifiers
- IUPAC name: 1-Methyl-3-[3-methyl-4-[4-(trifluoromethylsulfonyl)phenoxy]phenyl]-1,3,5-triazinane-2,4,6-trione
- CAS Number: 69004-04-2
- PubChem CID: 3050408
- ChemSpider: 2312474
- UNII: JPW84AS66U
- CompTox Dashboard (EPA): DTXSID7048958
- ECHA InfoCard: 100.157.907

Chemical and physical data
- Formula: C_{18}H_{14}F_{3}N_{3}O_{6}S
- Molar mass: 457.38 g·mol^{−1}
- 3D model (JSmol): Interactive image
- SMILES: CC1=C(C=CC(=C1)N2C(=O)NC(=O)N(C2=O)C)OC3=CC=C(C=C3)S(=O)(=O)C(F)(F)F
- InChI: InChI=1S/C18H14F3N3O6S/c1-10-9-11(24-16(26)22-15(25)23(2)17(24)27)3-8-14(10)30-12-4-6-13(7-5-12)31(28,29)18(19,20)21/h3-9H,1-2H3,(H,22,25,26); Key:VBUNOIXRZNJNAD-UHFFFAOYSA-N

Ponazuril (INN), sold by Merial, Inc., now part of Boehringer Ingelheim, under the trade name Marquis (15% w/w ponazuril), is a drug currently approved for the treatment of equine protozoal myeloencephalitis (EPM) in horses, caused by coccidia Sarcocystis neurona. Veterinarians have been preparing a formulary version of the medication for use in small animals such as cats, dogs, and rabbits against coccidia as an intestinal parasite. Treatment for intestinal coccidia in small animals is far shorter than treatment for EPM. NOTE: Dogs suffering from seizures due to Toxoplasma gondii, Neospora caninum, Neospora hughesi, Sarcocystis neurona, or other obligate intracellular coccidian protozoal parasites known to cause brain and spinal column disease, can be effectively treated using ponazuril for a minimum of 90 days. Ponazuril is coccidiocidal, meaning that if treatment is continuous for 90 days or more, seizures may cease in dogs and other companion animals. Testing for these neurological coccidial parasites should be done using IFAT technology (Indirect Immunofluorescence Antibody Titer testing), as other laboratory testing methods can and will result in notoriously false negative results. Along with its analogue ACD856, ponazuril (also known as ACD855) is a positive allosteric modulator of the tropomyosin receptor kinases TrkA and TrkB.

== See also ==
- Clazuril
- Diclazuril
- Toltrazuril
