= GAS7 =

Protein-coding gene in the species Homo sapiens

Identifiers
- Aliases: GAS7, MLL/growth arrest specific 7
- External IDs: OMIM: 603127; MGI: 1202388; GeneCards: GAS7
Available structures
PDB	Ortholog search: PDBe RCSB
PDB	List of PDB id codes 2LX7, 2YSH

Gene location (Human)
Chr.	Chromosome 17 (human)
Band	17p13.1	Start	9,910,606 bp
Band	17p13.1	End	10,198,606 bp

Gene location (Mouse)
Chr.	Chromosome 11 (mouse)
Band	11|11 B3	Start	67,345,917 bp
Band	11|11 B3	End	67,575,800 bp
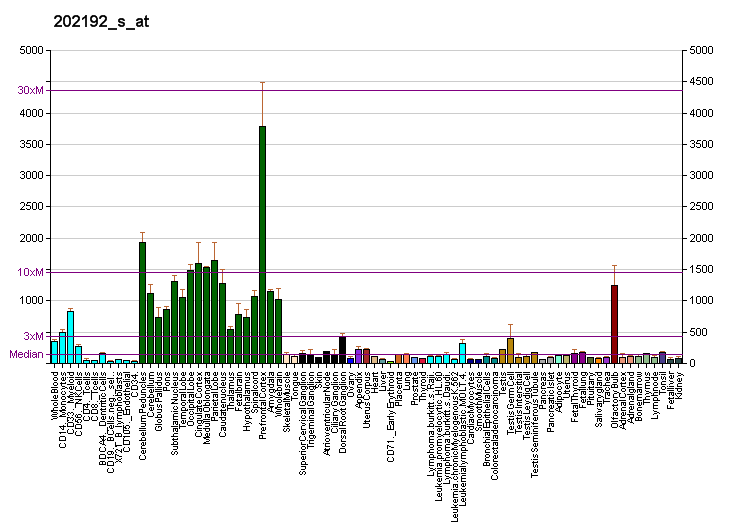

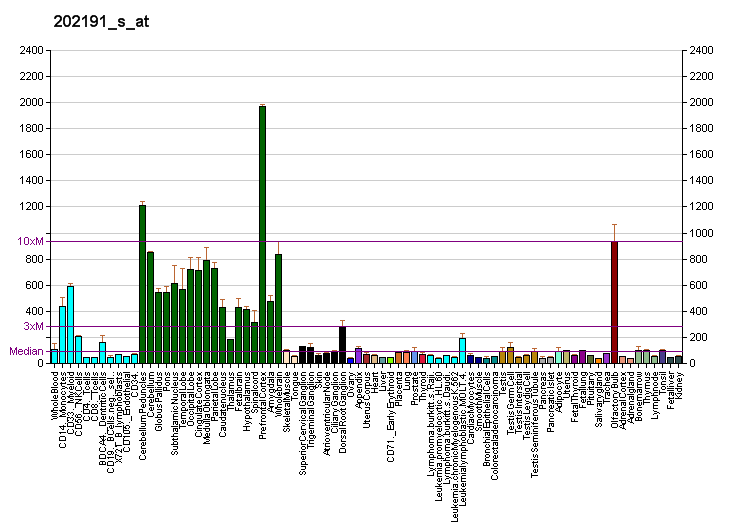

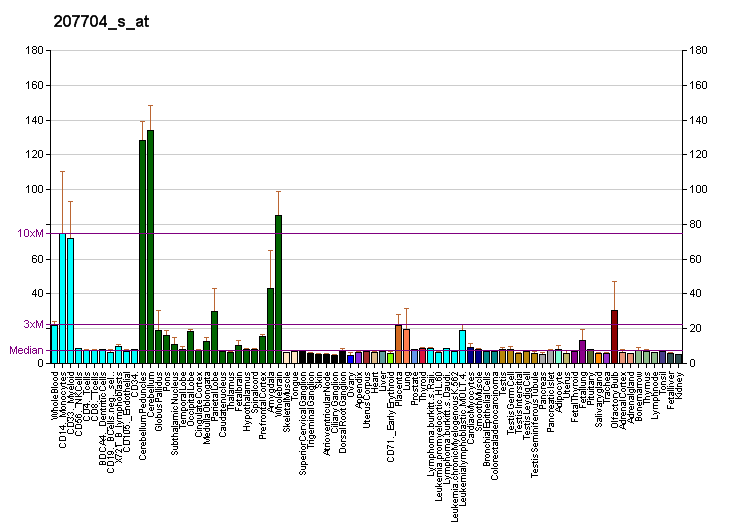
RNA expression pattern
Bgee	Human / Mouse (ortholog); Top expressed in: cerebellar vermis; parietal lobe; Brodmann area 10; postcentral gyrus; trigeminal ganglion; external globus pallidus; sural nerve; olfactory bulb; inferior ganglion of vagus nerve; spinal ganglia / Top expressed in: dentate gyrus of hippocampal formation granule cell; superior frontal gyrus; neural layer of retina; cerebellar cortex; gastrula; lobe of cerebellum; primary visual cortex; cerebellar vermis; nucleus accumbens; esophagus; More reference expression data
BioGPS	More reference expression data
Gene ontology
Molecular function	DNA-binding transcription factor activity; protein binding; cytoskeletal protein binding; actin filament binding
Cellular component	cytoplasm; cytoskeleton; actin filament; plasma membrane
Biological process	multicellular organism development; cell differentiation; nervous system development; regulation of transcription, DNA-templated; actin filament polymerization; neuron differentiation; neuron projection morphogenesis
Sources:Amigo / QuickGO
Orthologs
Databases	NCBI: entry; OMA: entry
Species	Human	Mouse
Entrez	8522	14457
Ensembl	ENSG00000007237	ENSMUSG00000033066
UniProt	O60861	Q60780
RefSeq (mRNA)	NM_001130831; NM_003644; NM_201432; NM_201433	NM_001109657; NM_001277079; NM_001277080; NM_008088
RefSeq (protein)	NP_001124303; NP_003635; NP_958836; NP_958839	n/a
Location (UCSC)	Chr 17: 9.91 – 10.2 Mb	Chr 11: 67.35 – 67.58 Mb
PubMed search
- Wikidata
View/Edit Human	View/Edit Mouse

Growth arrest-specific protein 7 is a protein that in humans is encoded by the GAS7 gene.

Growth arrest-specific 7 is expressed primarily in terminally differentiated brain cells and predominantly in mature cerebellar Purkinje neurons. GAS7 plays a putative role in neuronal development. Several transcript variants encoding proteins which vary in the N-terminus have been described.
