= Neospora hughesi =

Scientific classification
- Domain: Eukaryota
- Clade: Sar
- Clade: Alveolata
- Phylum: Apicomplexa
- Class: Conoidasida
- Order: Eucoccidiorida
- Family: Sarcocystidae
- Genus: Neospora
- Species: N. hughesi

Binomial name
- Neospora hughesi Marsh et al.1998

Species of bacterium

Neospora hughesi is an apicomplexan obligate parasite that causes myelitis and equine protozoal myeloencephalitis (EPM) in horses, and has only been documented in North America. EPM is a neurological disease from lesions in the spinal cord, brain stem, or brain from parasites such as N. hughesi or Sarcocystis neurona. Signs that a horse may have EPM include ataxia, muscle atrophy, difficulty swallowing, and head tilt. There are antiprotozoal drugs, such as the 28-day course of ponazuril, to treat the disease, as well as anti-inflammatories to alleviate neurologic symptoms

== Taxonomy ==
Neospora hughesi was considered the same parasite as Sarcocystis neurona, Neospora spp. (including N. caninum), and Toxoplasma gondii until the 1970s, when innovations in macromolecular analysis suggested phenotypic and molecular differences, which resulted in the divergence of species. However, it is now observed that both Neospora species and Sarcocystis species cause EPM, with the latter being more common.

Neospora hughesi is a member of the Apicomplexa phylum, a phylum of mainly parasitic alveolates and obligate intracellular parasites. This phylum also includes the protozoa that cause malaria (Plasmodium) and toxoplasmosis (Toxoplasma).

Sarcocystis neurona is in the same family as Neospora hughesi and is the most common parasite that causes EPM. Toxoplasma gondii also is in the Sarcocystidae family, and is hallmarked as the feline analogue to S. neurona and N. hughesi. Molecular analysis concluded that N. hughesi is specific to equid species.

== Discovery ==
=== Etymology ===
Neospora hughesi is named after one of the discoverers, J.P. Hughes, a veterinary researcher whose interests in toxoplasmosis, sarcocystosis, and neosporosis, led to the differentiation of the aforementioned species. The genus Neospora is Greek for neo, or new, and spora, or seed.

=== Methods ===
The first pathogenic Neospora species was first reported to cause paralysis in dogs in 1988, and had therefore been termed Neospora caninum. Successive neonatal and fetal infections caused by Neospora-like protozoa had later been discovered in deer, goats, cattle, and horses. Characterization studies had failed to differentiate canine and bovine isolates, and both were identified as N. caninum based on its similarities in immune responses to viruses and similar internal transcribed spacer (ITS-1) regions. ITSs are sections on nonfunctional RNA in rRNA that precede the genomic transcripts and are often used to detect similarities across species. Only by ITS sequencing was Neospora hughesi discovered. A 1998 paper by Antoinette E. Marsh, Bradd C. Barr, Andrea E. Packham, and Patricia A. Conrad. demonstrates the "ultrastructural, molecular, and antigenic characterization" of an equine Neospora species isolate, NE1. Via transmission electron microscopy (TEM) of parasites isolated from equine spinal cord tissue, E. Marsh et al. discovered a distinct species, Neospora hughesi.

Comparison of N. hughesi to canine and bovine N. caninum isolates revealed phenotypic differences in immunoreactive proteins. In preparation for the TEM, a total of 103 randomly oriented bradyzoite (quiescent parasites) profiles in eight tissue cysts and 69 tachyzoite (actively proliferating parasites) profiles were examined in the host nerve tissue. These NE1 isolates (N. hughesi) were grown in monkey kidney cells, whereas the N. caninum isolate (CN1) was cultured from the central nervous system of a six-week-old Rhodesian Ridgeback puppy born with neurological deficits. The puppy had a N. caninum fluorescent antibody test (IFAT) titer to confirm infection. In the study, the bovine N. caninum isolate (BPA1) was cultured under the same conditions as the aforementioned isolates. Viable tachyzoites from all three isolates (CN1, BPA1, and NE1) were harvested from similarly infected monolayers, and the culture medium containing tachyzoites underwent a series of filtering and pelleting steps to isolate the protein and DNA. Uninfected cell monolayer cultures were treated under the same conditions to serve as a negative control. Tachyzoite pellets and the control cells were separated via SDS-PAGE, and purified antigens were transferred to nitrocellulose gel incubated with antibodies to determine molecular characterization via Polymerase Chain Reaction (PCR). PCR amplifies the nuclear small subunit RNA ((nss)-rRNA) so that the ITS-1 regions could be compared amongst the isolates, ultimately deducing that the NE1 isolate is a separate Neospora species, N. hughesi.

== Morphology ==
Apicomplexa have a complex life cycle, whereby they have three infective stages, including an invasive tachyzoite (proliferating), bradyzoite in tissue cysts (quiescent), and sporozoite (environmental) stages. In the definitive host (which is unknown at this time), the parasite undergoes its proliferative cycle in the intestines, ultimately passing unsporulated oocysts (sporozoites) in feces. These oocysts then sporulate from the fecal matter, and when an intermediate host (the horse) ingests them, tachyzoites proliferate and form cellular conglomerates composed of bradyzoites (quiescent cells) in both skeletal and nervous tissues (including the spinal cord). Tachyzoites in the intermediate host (horses) vary in shape from crescent-shaped to round and measure around 7μm by 5μm, and are found in a variety of organs and tissues. N. hughesi tissue cysts are most commonly found in the central nervous system, but can be found in eye muscles or aborted fetuses too. These cysts can measure 100μm in diameter and are constituted of bradyzoites that measure around 7μm by 1.5μm.

== Metabolism ==
The organisms classified under the Apicomplexa phylum possess a unique organelle structure called an apicoplast, which plays a vital role in lipid metabolism. The apicoplast originated from algae through secondary endosymbiosis, resulting in a four-membrane bound plastid that contains its own DNA. The apicoplast genome is comparably small, with a size of 35 kb encoding 30-50 genes which are involved in fundamental cellular processing utilizing DNA and RNA. The Neospora spp. are obligate intracellular parasites, meaning that they hijack host cell machinery to proliferate whilst in the tachyzoite life stage of the parasite.

== Genomics ==
The complete genome of N. hughesi has not yet been sequenced, but partial apicoplast and mitochondrial genomes have been. The largest partial apicoplast genome sequenced is a 440bp linear DNA that encodes for the RNA polymerase beta subunit gene. Among the other sequenced genes are the apicoplast caseinolytic protease C gene and the mitochondrial cytochrome-b gene, responsible for protein regulation and cellular respiration, relatively.

== Physiology ==
Neospora hughesi is a Gram-positive, obligate intracellular parasite with cocci morphology. N. hughesi contain apicomplexan-specific organelles that secrete enzymes vital for the development of the parasitic vacuole in the host. This parasitic vacuole protects the parasite from host cell defense mechanisms via regulation of secretory organelles.

Apicomplexans also have an inner membrane complex (IMC) that partakes in parasite movement, replication, and invasion of the host. Apicomplexans are aptly named for a specific organelle called an apicoplast, which plays a vital role in lipid metabolism. All specialized organelles are located on the apical side of the parasite, hence the name Apicomplexa.

== Ecology and host range ==
Although there is no definitive host for N. hughesi, it is suggested that horses are infected with N. hughesi by exposure (ingestion) to sporozoites from the feces of the host- the same mechanism as its close sister taxa Sarcocystis neurona and Neospora caninum.

Neospora hughesi has been implicated as the cause of clinical disease in Equine protozoal myeloencephalitis (EPM) cases. There have been no cases of EPM caused by Neospora species outside of the United States interestingly. It is estimated that EPM causes symptomatic disease in roughly 1% of horses exposed to the sporulated oocysts.

== Environmental implications ==
Neospora hughesi can cause infection of the central nervous system, EPM. Due to lack of research of N. hughesi and because the host for S. neurona, the opossum, is isolated to the United States only, EPM is not generally considered as a diagnosis differential of horses of non-United States origin. However, given the recent differentiation of N. hughesi from S. neurona, EPM from N. hughesi should be integrated into equine veterinary medicine as a diagnostic differential for neurological symptoms. There have been recent cases of horses imported from North America infected with EPM in the Netherlands and other European countries. This has led to enhanced quarantine measures for imported horses and awareness of EPM and other parasitic-driven diseases in equids.

Infection with N. hughesi has been associated with neuromuscular disease and fetal abortions, but it is not as well studied as Sarcocystis neurona is. Transmission from N. hughesi-infected horses to foals has been reported, but not all will develop clinical disease, as is supported in N. caninum studies in canines and coyotes. With the increased transportation of horses from the United States to other countries, it is critical that more research be conducted to understand the mechanisms and definitive hosts to prevent the spread of N. hughesi before it becomes transmissible in other parts of the world. Currently, the potential of N. hughesi is unknown, so it is worthwhile to determine definitive hosts and implications to prevent an outbreak of neosporosis.
