= Cerebellar abiotrophy =

Genetic condition in animals

- Other names: cerebellar ataxia, CA, CCA
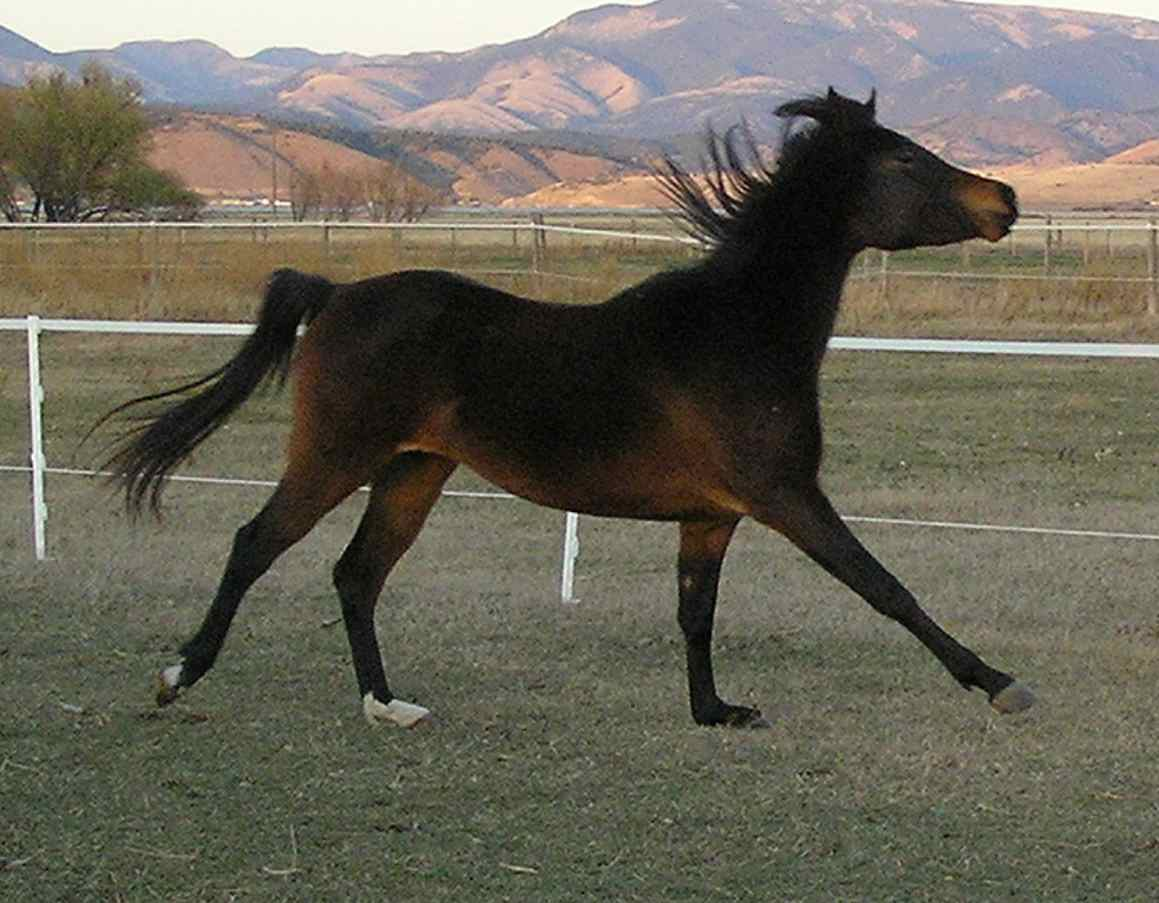
- A two-year-old Arabian horse with cerebellar abiotrophy, showing stiff awkward gait, and upper range of unnatural head bob. Though this horse had a relatively mild case, it could never be ridden.
- Pronunciation: cerebeller abiotrophy
- Specialty: Veterinary medicine, genetic diseases
- Symptoms: ataxia, hyperreactivity, inability to judge distance
- Complications: death due to injuries sustained
- Usual onset: at or shortly after birth
- Duration: lifelong
- Causes: genetic mutation causing loss of purkinje cells in the cerebellum
- Risk factors: falls, colliding with objects
- Diagnostic method: DNA test, post-mortem examination of brain tissue
- Differential diagnosis: Wobbler syndrome, EHV-1, Equine Protozoal Myeloencephalitis, concussion
- Prevention: Avoid breeding carrier animals
- Treatment: None
- Medication: None
- Prognosis: Varies by severity, severely disabled animals may be euthanized for humane reasons.
- Frequency: Varies by species and breed

Cerebellar abiotrophy (CA), also called cerebellar cortical abiotrophy (CCA), is a genetic neurological disease in animals, best known to affect certain breeds of horses, dogs and cats. It can also develop in humans. It develops when the neurons known as Purkinje cells, located in the cerebellum of the brain, begin to die off. These cells affect balance and coordination. They have a critical role to play in the brain. The Purkinje layer allows communication between the granular and molecular cortical layers in the cerebellum. Put simply, without Purkinje cells, an animal loses its sense of space and distance, making balance and coordination difficult. People with damage to the cerebellum can experience symptoms like unsteady gait, poor muscle control, and trouble speaking or swallowing.

Abiotrophy means the loss of a vital nutritive factor. The cause of cerebellar abiotrophy is not known, but it is thought to be due to an intrinsic metabolic defect.

In most cases, the Purkinje neurons begin to die off shortly after the animal is born and the condition is noticeable when the animal is less than six months old, though sometimes the onset of symptoms is gradual and the animal is much older before the owner or caretaker notices a problem.

Cerebellar abiotrophy cannot be prevented, other than by selective breeding to avoid the gene, and it cannot be cured. Genetic testing can detect carriers. In addition to dogs and horses, there also have been cases of cerebellar abiotrophy in Siamese and Domestic shorthair cats; in Angus, Polled Hereford, Charolais and Holstein Friesian cattle; Merino and Wiltshire sheep; and Yorkshire pigs.

== Terminology ==
The condition in Kerry Blue Terriers is sometimes called progressive neuronal abiotrophy. Other terms used to describe the condition in dogs include cerebellar cortical atrophy and postnatal cerebellar cortical degeneration.

Cerebellar abiotrophy in horses was originally thought to be a form of cerebellar hypoplasia (CH) and was described as such in older research literature. However, it was discovered that in horses, the die-off of purkinje cells began after the animal was born, rather than occurring in utero. Cerebellar hypoplasia is distinctly different in that it is a condition from a lack of these cells being formed during the development of the cerebellum. CH has been found in several species, including cats, dogs, cows and sheep.

There are other diseases that lead to cerebellar degeneration, but the loss of Purkinje cells is a clear way to diagnose cerebellar abiotrophy, and the combination of clinical signs is sufficiently unique that cerebellar abiotrophy can easily be distinguished from other conditions, even in a living animal.

== Clinical signs ==
Symptoms of cerebellar abiotrophy include ataxia or lack of balance, an awkward wide-legged stance, a head tremor (intention tremor) (in dogs, body tremors also occur), hyperreactivity, lack of menace reflex, stiff or high-stepping gait, coarse or jerky head bob when in motion (or, in very young animals, when attempting to nurse), apparent lack of awareness of where the feet are (sometimes standing or trying to walk with a foot knuckled over), poor depth perception, and a general inability to determine space and distance. The symptoms, when taken as a group, are distinctive and not easily mimicked by other illnesses, though certain types of neurological injury and infection need to be ruled out. Verifying the diagnosis in a laboratory setting is possible only by examining the brain post-mortem to determine if there has been a loss of Purkinje cells.

Most affected animals have normal intelligence and mildly affected animals can, in theory, live out a normal lifespan. However, affected animals are quite accident-prone, and for this reason many animals that develop cerebellar abiotrophy, particularly horses, are euthanized for humane reasons. Horses may experience difficulty stepping up and over objects, run into fences, fall easily, and even if allowed to mature to full growth, are generally considered unsafe to ride. Dogs may need lifetime assistance with tasks such as climbing stairs.

In horses, the symptoms may worsen from the time of onset for six to 12 months, but if not severe enough to mandate euthanasia, they stabilize over time. In some dog breeds, symptoms appear to progressively worsen, but research is not consistent on this point. There also is some evidence that affected animals partially compensate for the condition by cognitively learning alternative methods for moving or to determine distance, and thus appear to improve because they become less accident-prone.

== Horses ==
Cerebellar abiotrophy is best known as a condition affecting Arabian horses. It has also been observed in the Welsh pony and cob, the Australian pony, Curly horse, Miniature horse, the Gotland Pony, one Eriskay Pony, and possibly the Oldenburg. Most foals appear normal at birth, with symptoms noticeable at an average age of four months, though there have been cases where the condition is first seen shortly after birth and other cases where symptoms are first recognized in horses over one year of age.

Breeds DNA tested that reveal some carrier lines, but to date no affected animals, include the Welsh pony and the Trakehner. However, other breeds heavily influenced by Arabian breeding, such as the Thoroughbred and the American Saddlebred, do not appear to carry the mutation.

In horses, cerebellar abiotrophy is believed to be linked to an autosomal recessive gene. This means it is not sex-linked, and the allele has to be carried and passed on by both parents in order for an affected animal to be born. Horses that only carry one copy of the gene may pass it on to their offspring, but themselves are perfectly healthy—without symptoms of the disease. Because it is recessive, the allele for cerebellar abiotrophy may pass through multiple generations before it is expressed.

Cerebellar abiotrophy is sometimes misdiagnosed. Though the symptoms are quite distinguishable from other neurological conditions, it has been confused with Wobbler's syndrome, equine protozoal myeloencephalitis, and injury-related problems such as a concussion.

A DNA test which identifies markers associated with cerebellar abiotrophy became available in 2008. The test was refined to identify the most likely mutations, and retesting of earlier samples based on an earlier indirect marker test developed by UCD, indicated a 97% accuracy rate for the old test relative to the newer version, with no false negatives. The causative mutation was identified on the gene TOE1 in 2011. Research on cerebellar abiotrophy and the DNA test was led by the Veterinary Genetics Laboratory at the UC Davis School of Veterinary Medicine. Researchers working on this problem include Drs. Cecilia Penedo and Leah Brault. Dr. Ann T. Bowling made significant early contributions to the genetics research on cerebellar abiotrophy.

== Dogs ==
Cerebellar abiotrophy has been seen in the Australian Kelpie, Gordon Setter, Border Collie, Labrador Retriever, Airedale Terrier, English Pointer, Scottish Terrier, Kerry Blue Terrier, Miniature Schnauzer, Lagotto Romagnolo, and other dog breeds. Time of onset varies. In a few breeds, such as the Beagle, Rough Collie, and Miniature Poodle, Purkinje cells begin to die off at or shortly before birth, and pups are born with symptoms or develop symptoms by three to four weeks of age. Most breeds prone to the condition, such as the Kerry Blue Terrier, Border Collie, Australian Kelpie, and Labrador Retriever, begin showing symptoms between six and sixteen weeks of age. In a very few breeds, such as the American Staffordshire Terrier, Old English Sheepdog, Brittany Spaniel, and Gordon Setter, symptoms do not appear until adulthood or even middle age.

In dogs, cerebellar abiotrophy is also usually an autosomal recessive gene, but in a few breeds, such as the English Pointer, the gene is sex-linked.

== Bibliography ==
- deLahunta, Alexander; deLahunta, Alexander (1983). Veterinary Neuroanatomy and Clinical Neurology (2nd ed.). Philadelphia: Saunders. ISBN 0-7216-3029-4.
- deLahunta, Alexander; Summers, Brian Alan; Cummings, John Thomas (1995). Veterinary neuropathology. St. Louis: Mosby. ISBN 0-8016-5063-1.

=== Cerebellar abiotrophy in horses ===
- Adams, Ragan; Mayhew, Ian G. (April 1985). "Neurologic Diseases". Veterinary Clinics of North America: Equine Practice. 1 (1): 209–234. doi:10.1016/S0749-0739(17)30778-2. PMID 3000543.
- "Genetic Diseases." Arabian Horse Association
- AHA Equine Stress, Research; Education Committee (August–September 2007). "Caution and Knowledge" (PDF). Modern Arabian Horse: 100–105. Archived from the original (PDF) on 2009-03-03.
- Baird JD, Mackenzie CD (January 1974). "Cerebellar hypoplasia and degeneration in part-Arab horses". Australian Veterinary Journal. 50 (1): 25–28. doi:10.1111/j.1751-0813.1974.tb09367.x. PMID 4819469.
- Beatty, Margaret T.; Leipold, H.W.; Cash, W.; et al. (1985). "Cerebellar Disease in Arabian Horses". Proceedings of the 21st annual convention of the American Association of Equine Practitioners. pp. 241–255.
- Beech, Jill (1976). "Cerebellar Hypoplasia". Proceedings of the Twenty-Second Annual Convention of the American Association of Equine Practitioners. Dallas, Texas: 77–78.
- Björck G, Everz KE, Hansen HJ, Henricson B (May 1973). "Congenital cerebellar ataxia in the gotland pony breed". Zentralbl Veterinarmed A. 20 (4): 341–354. doi:10.1111/j.1439-0442.1973.tb00892.x. PMID 4199630.
- Blanco A, Moyano R, Vivo J, et al. (August 2006). "Purkinje cell apoptosis in Arabian horses with cerebellar abiotrophy". Journal of Veterinary Medicine. A, Physiology, Pathology, Clinical Medicine. 53 (6): 286–287. doi:10.1111/j.1439-0442.2006.00836.x. PMID 16901270.
- "Cerebellar Abiotrophy," Fact sheet, UC Davis Veterinary Genetics Laboratory.
- "Changing Times: Cerebellar Abiotrophy". Journal of Equine Veterinary Science. 25 (10): 452. October 2005. doi:10.1016/j.jevs.2005.09.010.
- DeBowes RM, Leipold HW, Turner-Beatty M (August 1987). "Cerebellar abiotrophy". Veterinary Clinics of North America: Equine Practice. 3 (2): 345–352. doi:10.1016/S0749-0739(17)30677-6. PMID 3497695.
- de Lahunta A (January 1990). "Abiotrophy in domestic animals: a review". Canadian Journal of Veterinary Research. 54 (1): 65–76. PMC 1255608. PMID 2407332.
- Fox J, Duncan R, Friday P, Klein B, Scarratt W (May 2000). "Cerebello-olivary and lateral (accessory) cuneate degeneration in a juvenile American Miniature horse". Veterinary Pathology. 37 (3): 271–274. doi:10.1354/vp.37-3-271. PMID 10810993. S2CID 6816810.
- Gerber H, Gaillard C, Fatzer R, Marti E, Pfistner B, Sustronck B, Ueltschi G, Meier HP, Herholz C, Straub R, Geissbuhler U, Gerber V (1995). "Cerebellar abiotrophy in pure-bred arabians". Pferdeheilkunde (in German). 11 (6): 423–443. doi:10.21836/PEM19950606. hdl:1854/LU-186885. ISSN 0177-7726.
- Goodwin-Campiglio, Lisa. "Cerebellar Abiotrophy." F.O.A.L., accessed November 6, 2011.
- Hahn, Caroline (2006). "The wobbly horse: differential diagnoses". In Practice. 28: 8–13. doi:10.1136/inpract.28.1.8. S2CID 74289018.
- Johnson, Robert S. "Test Allows Arabian Breeders to Scan for Inherited Neurologic Disorder" The Horse online edition, September 23 2008, Article # 12746. Accessed September 23, 2008
- MacKay RJ (August 2005). "Neurologic disorders of neonatal foals". Veterinary Clinics of North America: Equine Practice. 21 (2): 387–406, vii. doi:10.1016/j.cveq.2005.04.006. PMID 16051055.
- Palmer AC, Blakemore WF, Cook WR, Platt H, Whitwell KE (July 1973). "Cerebellar hypoplasia and degeneration in the young Arab horse: clinical and neuropathological features". Veterinary Record. 93 (3): 62–66. doi:10.1136/vr.93.3.62. PMID 4748678. S2CID 441746.
- Penedo, M. Cecilia T. and Leah Brault. "Progress Toward Identifying the Gene Responsible for Equine Cerebellar Abiotrophy (CA)." Genetics, Research Review, 2006, Center for Equine Health, University of California, Davis. Accessed November 6, 2011
- Reich, Cindy (March 2007). "Genetic Diseases: Breed Responsibly". Arabian Horse World. 47 (6): 277–279.
- Reich, Cindy (January 2009). "Cerebellar Abiotrophy: Carrier Status Announced". Arabian Horse World: 438–439.
- Sponseller, Brett A. A Pedigree Analysis of Cerebellar Cortical Abiotrophy in the Arabian Horse. (Fourth-year seminar paper). Ithaca, NY: College of Veterinary Medicine, Cornell University, 1994.
- Sponseller, Max (1967). "Equine cerebellar hypoplasia and degeneration". Proceedings of the 13th annual convention of the American Association of Equine Practitioners. pp. 123–126.
- Waelchli RO, Ehrensperger F (November 1988). "Two related cases of cerebellar abnormality in equine fetuses associated with hydrops of fetal membranes". Veterinary Record. 123 (20): 513–514. doi:10.1136/vr.123.20.513. PMID 3206793. S2CID 45046756.
- WAHO. "Genetic Disorders in Arabian Horses: Current Research Projects." World Arabian Horse Association, accessed online October 23, 2007

=== Cerebellar abiotrophy in dogs ===
- General information on genetics, breeding strategies, disease control and diversity. Mostly articles on dogs, but relevant to other species

=== Cerebellar abiotrophy in cats ===
- Barone G, Foureman P, deLahunta A (2002). "Adult-onset cerebellar cortical abiotrophy and retinal degeneration in a domestic shorthair cat". Journal of the American Animal Hospital Association. 38 (1): 51–54. doi:10.5326/0380051. PMID 11804315.
