= Clazuril =

Chemical compound

Clinical data
- ATCvet code: QP51BC02 (WHO)

Identifiers
- IUPAC name: [2-Chloro-4-(3,5-dioxo-4,5-dihydro-1,2,4-triazin-2(3H)-yl)phenyl](4-chlorophenyl)acetonitrile
- CAS Number: 101831-36-1
- PubChem CID: 58901
- ChemSpider: 53093
- UNII: O8W0R05772
- ChEMBL: ChEMBL2104190
- CompTox Dashboard (EPA): DTXSID30869364

Chemical and physical data
- Formula: C_{17}H_{10}Cl_{2}N_{4}O_{2}
- Molar mass: 373.19 g·mol^{−1}
- 3D model (JSmol): Interactive image
- SMILES: Clc1ccc(cc1)C(C#N)c3c(Cl)cc(N2/N=C\C(=O)NC2=O)cc3
- InChI: InChI=1S/C17H10Cl2N4O2/c18-11-3-1-10(2-4-11)14(8-20)13-6-5-12(7-15(13)19)23-17(25)22-16(24)9-21-23/h1-7,9,14H,(H,22,24,25); Key:QUUTUGLQZLNABV-UHFFFAOYSA-N

Clazuril is a drug used in veterinary medicine as a coccidiostat.

== See also ==
- Diclazuril
- Ponazuril
- Toltrazuril
