= ACD856 =

TrkA and TrkB positive modulator

Clinical data
- Other names: ACD-856
- Routes of administration: Oral
- Drug class: Tropomyosin receptor kinase TrkA, TrkB, and TrkC positive allosteric modulator

Pharmacokinetic data
- Elimination half-life: ~19 hours

ACD856, or ACD-856, is a tropomyosin receptor kinase TrkA, TrkB, and TrkC positive allosteric modulator which is under development for the treatment of Alzheimer's disease, depressive disorders, sleep disorders, and traumatic brain injuries. It is taken by mouth.

== Pharmacology ==
The drug potentiates the tropomyosin receptor kinases TrkA, TrkB, and TrkC with EC_{50} values of 382 nM, 295 nM, and ~330 nM, respectively. As a positive allosteric modulator of TrkA and TrkB, ACD856 potentiates the effects of brain-derived neurotrophic factor (BDNF) and nerve growth factor (NGF).

In addition to the tropomyosin receptor kinases, ACD856 is also a similarly potent positive allosteric modulator of certain other receptor tyrosine kinases, including the insulin-like growth factor 1 receptor (IGF1R) and the fibroblast growth factor receptor 1 (FGFR1). However, its efficacies at the IGF1R and FGFR1 were much lower than at the TrkA, TrkB, and TrkC.

In animals, ACD856 has been found to reverse scopolamine- and dizocilpine (MK-801)-induced memory impairment, to improve age-related memory deficits, and to have sustained antidepressant-like activity. It has also been reported to possess neuroprotective properties.

In humans, the drug has been shown to cross the blood–brain barrier and to induce dose-dependent changes in electroencephalogram parameters. No significant tolerability or safety concerns have been identified in preclinical research or phase 1 clinical trials. The drug's clinical pharmacokinetics have been characterized and its elimination half-life is approximately 19 hours.

== Chemistry ==
The chemical structure of ACD856 has not yet been disclosed as of 2024, but the structure of its predecessor ponazuril (ACD855) is known and both ponazuril and ACD856 have been described as triazinetriones.

== History ==
It was discovered through the use of high-throughput screening of 25,000 compounds. Toltrazuril and ponazuril (ACD855), two veterinary antiparasitic agents, were identified as possessing Trk-potentiating activity with this screen in 2013. ACD856 was derived via structural optimization of these compounds. In the case of ponazuril, this drug was said to have had too long of an elimination half-life to allow for development for use in humans. ACD856 was first described in the scientific literature by 2021.

== Clinical trials ==
ACD856 has completed phase 1 clinical trials for Alzheimer's disease. As of May 2024, it was in the preclinical stage of development for depressive disorders, sleep disorders, and traumatic brain injuries. Two phase 1 trials had been completed by 2022. A further phase 1b trial, assessing the safety and tolerability of repeated higher doses, reached its last patient visit in April 2026, and results were reported in June 2026. A phase 2 clinical trial in Alzheimer's disease was expected to start in 2026, supported by a €2.5 million European Innovation Council Accelerator grant awarded in 2025. The drug was developed by AlzeCure Pharma AB, which in July 2026 out-licensed worldwide rights to ACD856 and the NeuroRestore platform to the Danish company QuantumCell ApS for US$12 million upfront, with development and commercial milestone payments that could exceed US$2.2 billion.
