= PCP4 =

Protein-coding gene in the species Homo sapiens

Identifiers
- Aliases: PCP4, PEP-19, Purkinje cell protein 4
- External IDs: OMIM: 601629; MGI: 97509; HomoloGene: 4519; GeneCards: PCP4; OMA:PCP4 - orthologs

Gene location (Human)
Chr.	Chromosome 21 (human)
Band	21q22.2	Start	39,867,438 bp
Band	21q22.2	End	39,929,397 bp

Gene location (Mouse)
Chr.	Chromosome 16 (mouse)
Band	16 C4|16 56.97 cM	Start	96,268,806 bp
Band	16 C4|16 56.97 cM	End	96,326,993 bp
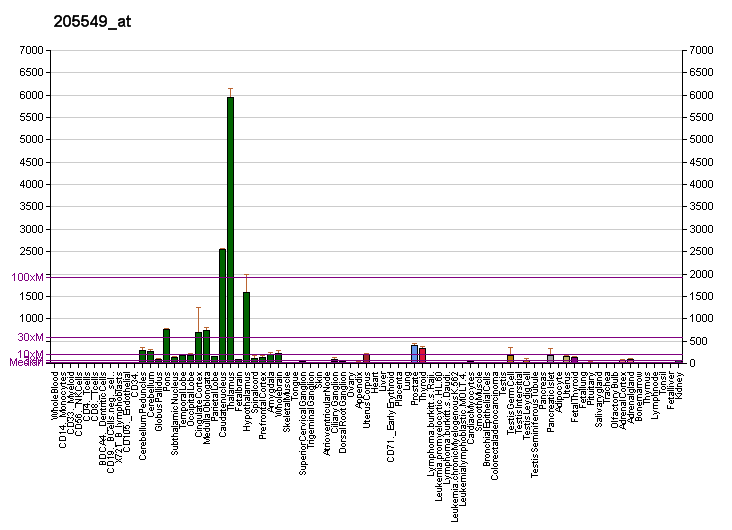
RNA expression pattern
Bgee	Human / Mouse (ortholog); Top expressed in: lateral nuclear group of thalamus; external globus pallidus; middle frontal gyrus; Epithelium of choroid plexus; putamen; caudate nucleus; nucleus accumbens; seminal vesicula; retinal pigment epithelium; internal globus pallidus / Top expressed in: striatum of neuraxis; olfactory bulb; cerebellum; layer of retina; neural layer of retina; cerebellar cortex; superior frontal gyrus; dentate gyrus of hippocampal formation granule cell; urinary bladder; primary visual cortex; More reference expression data
BioGPS	More reference expression data
Gene ontology
Molecular function	protein binding; calcium ion binding; calmodulin binding
Cellular component	cytosol; nucleus; protein-containing complex
Biological process	positive regulation of neuron differentiation; calmodulin dependent kinase signaling pathway
Sources:Amigo / QuickGO
Orthologs
Species	Human	Mouse
Entrez	5121	18546
Ensembl	ENSG00000183036	ENSMUSG00000090223
UniProt	P48539	P63054
RefSeq (mRNA)	NM_006198	NM_008791
RefSeq (protein)	NP_006189	NP_032817
Location (UCSC)	Chr 21: 39.87 – 39.93 Mb	Chr 16: 96.27 – 96.33 Mb
PubMed search
- Wikidata
View/Edit Human	View/Edit Mouse

Purkinje cell protein 4 is a protein that in humans is encoded by the PCP4 gene. Also known as PEP-19, PCP4 is a 7.6 kDa protein with an IQ-motif that binds to calmodulin (CaM). PCP4 is abundant in Purkinje cells of the cerebellum, and plays an important role in synaptic plasticity.

== Function ==
PCP4 knockout mice have been reported to exhibit impaired locomotor learning and markedly altered synaptic plasticity in cerebellar Purkinje neurons. PCP4 accelerates both the association and dissociation of calcium (Ca^{2+}) with calmodulin (CaM), which is postulated to influence the activity of CaM-dependent enzymes, especially CaM kinase II (CaMK-II).
