= Diclazuril =

Chemical compound

Clinical data
- Trade names: Coxiril, Vecoxan
- AHFS/Drugs.com: International Drug Names
- ATCvet code: QP51BC03 (WHO)

Identifiers
- IUPAC name: 2-(4-Chlorophenyl)-2-[2,6-dichloro-4-(3,5-dioxo-1,2,4-triazin-2-yl)phenyl]acetonitrile
- CAS Number: 101831-37-2
- PubChem CID: 456389
- ChemSpider: 401855
- UNII: K110K1B1VE
- KEGG: D03794
- ChEMBL: ChEMBL284733
- CompTox Dashboard (EPA): DTXSID4046787
- ECHA InfoCard: 100.168.055

Chemical and physical data
- Formula: C_{17}H_{9}Cl_{3}N_{4}O_{2}
- Molar mass: 407.64 g·mol^{−1}
- 3D model (JSmol): Interactive image
- SMILES: C1=CC(=CC=C1C(C#N)C2=C(C=C(C=C2Cl)N3C(=O)NC(=O)C=N3)Cl)Cl
- InChI: InChI=1S/C17H9Cl3N4O2/c18-10-3-1-9(2-4-10)12(7-21)16-13(19)5-11(6-14(16)20)24-17(26)23-15(25)8-22-24/h1-6,8,12H,(H,23,25,26); Key:ZSZFUDFOPOMEET-UHFFFAOYSA-N

Diclazuril (trade name Vecoxan) is a coccidiostat. In 2025 diclazuril has also been reported to interact with tubulin and inhibit its polymerization.

== See also ==
- Clazuril
- Ponazuril
- Toltrazuril
