= Purkinje cell =

Specialized neuron in the cerebellum

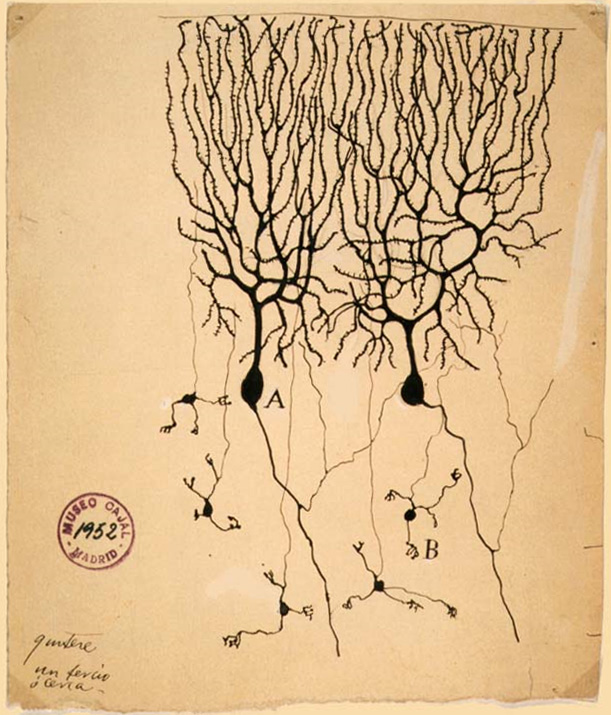
- Drawing of pigeon Purkinje cells (A) by Santiago Ramon y Cajal

Details
- Pronunciation: Often pronounced as /pɜːrˈkɪndʒi/ pur-KIN-jee; but Czech pronunciation is (Czech: [ˈpurkɪɲɛ] cells
- Location: Cerebellum
- Shape: Flat dendritic arbor
- Function: Inhibitory projection neuron
- Neurotransmitter: GABA
- Presynaptic connections: Parallel fibers and climbing fibers
- Postsynaptic connections: Cerebellar deep nuclei

Identifiers
- MeSH: D011689
- NeuroNames: 365
- NeuroLex ID: sao471801888
- TA98: A14.1.07.404
- FMA: 67969

Purkinje cells or Purkinje neurons, named for Czech physiologist Jan Evangelista Purkyně who identified them in 1837, are a unique type of prominent, large neuron located in the cerebellar cortex of the brain. With their flask-shaped cell bodies, many branching dendrites, and a single long axon, these cells are essential for controlling motor activity. Purkinje cells mainly release GABA (gamma-aminobutyric acid), a neurotransmitter which inhibits some neurons to reduce nerve impulse transmission. Purkinje cells efficiently control and coordinate the body's motor motions through these inhibitory actions.

== Structure ==
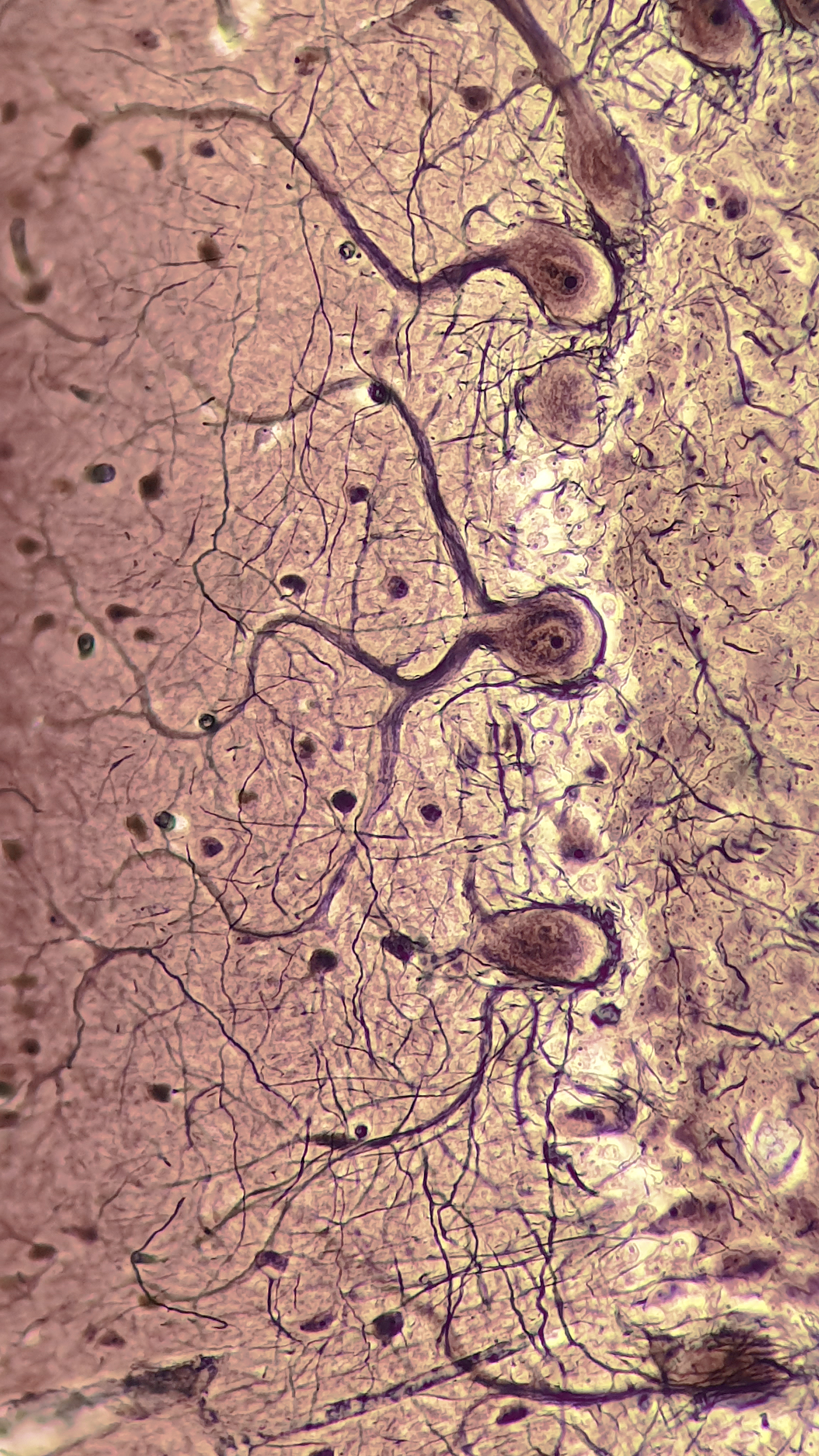
Neurons (Purkinje cells) located in the cerebellum

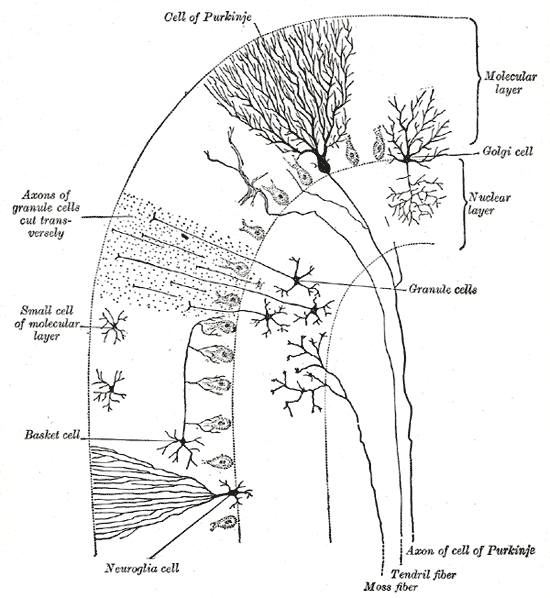
Transverse section of a cerebellar folium (Purkinje cell labeled at center top)

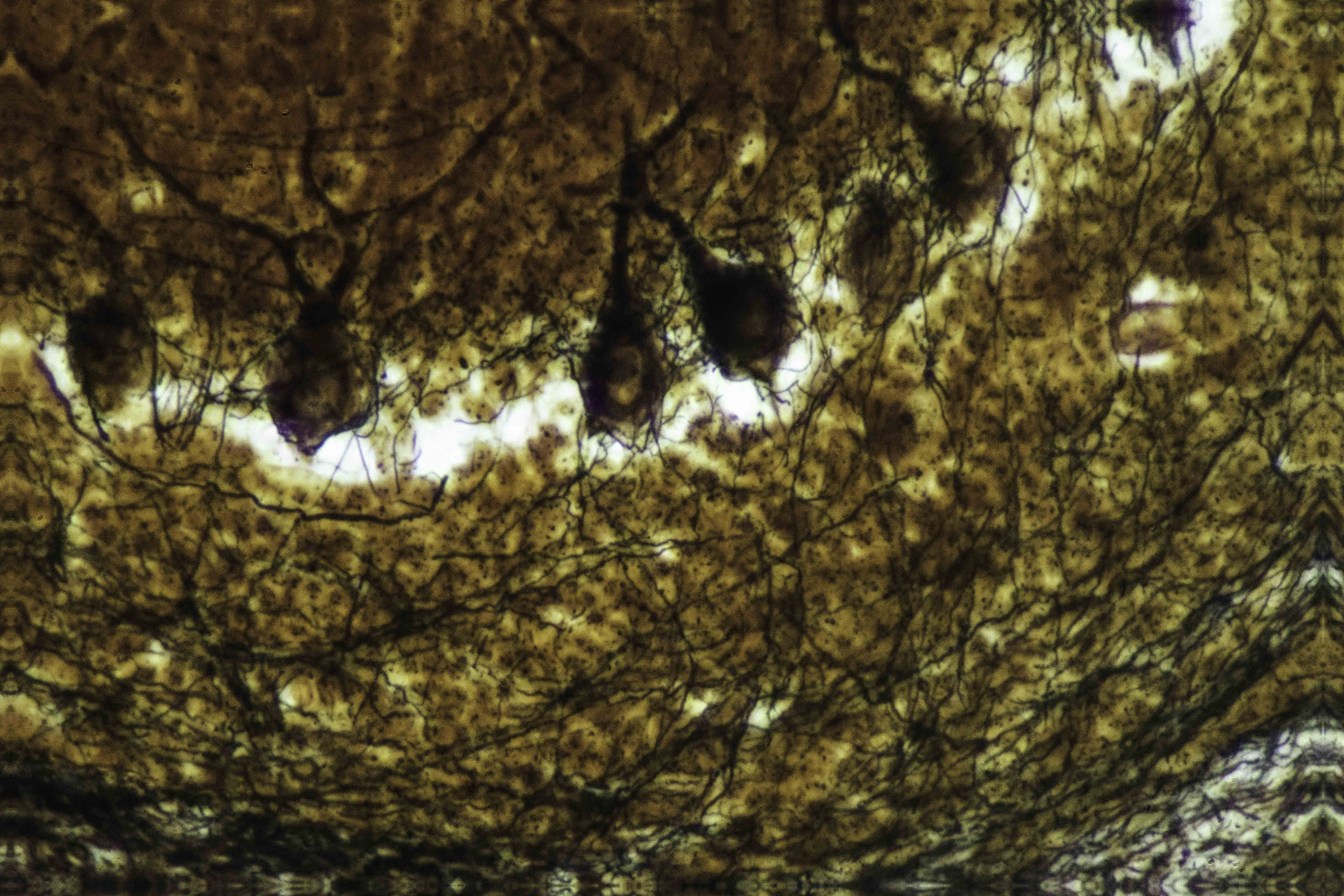
Silver stain of cerebellum showing Purkinje cells

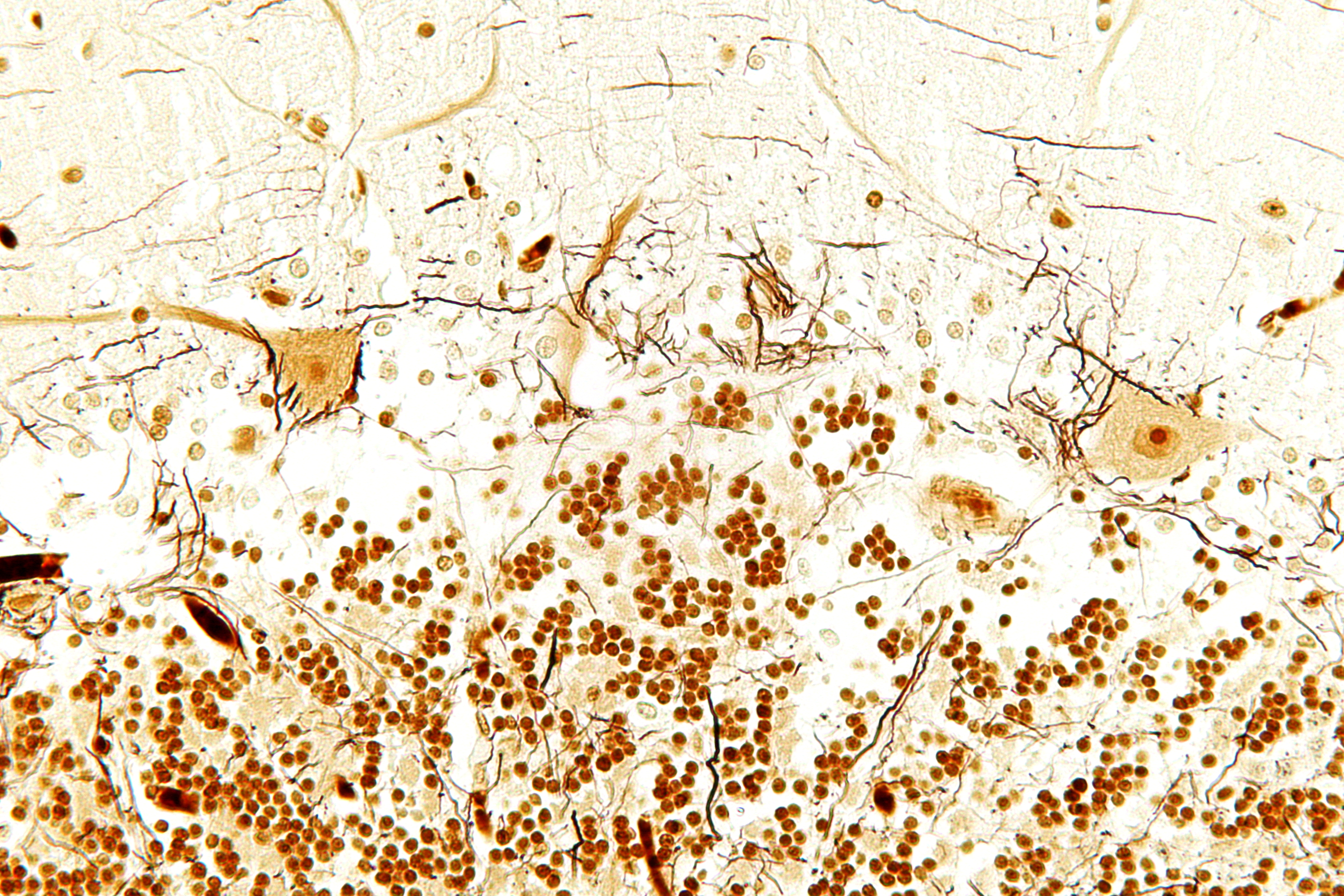
Purkinje cells. Bielschowsky stain.

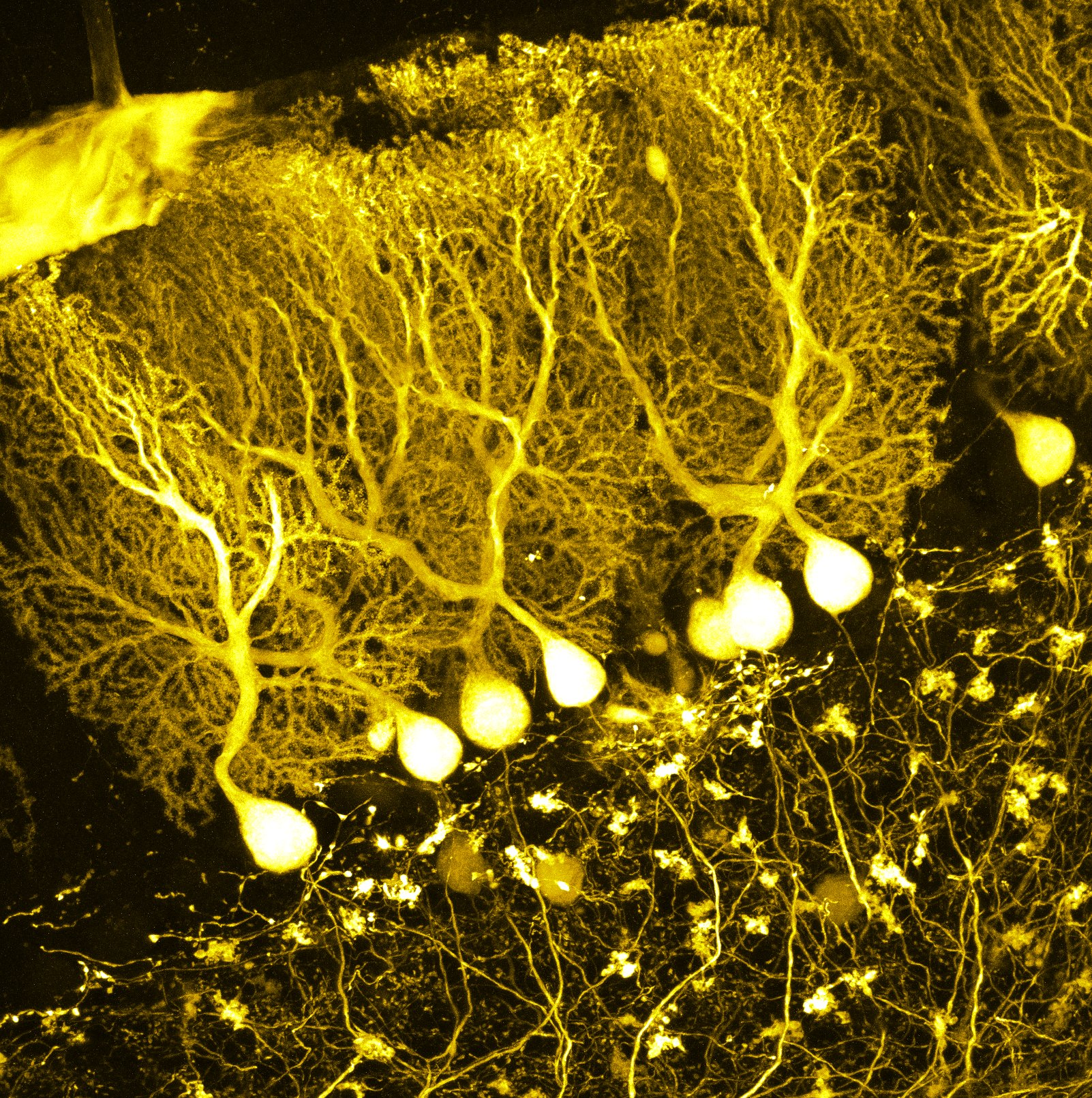
Confocal microscope image of cerebellar Purkinje cells expressing tdTomato

Purkinje cells are some of the largest neurons in the human brain (Betz cells being the largest), with an intricate and elaborate branching structure (known as a dendritic arbour) characterized by a large number of dendritic spines. Found within the Purkinje layer of the cerebellum, Purkinje cells align like dominos - stacked one in front of the other - with their expansive dendritic arbours forming almost-two-dimensional layers, through which parallel fibers from deeper-layers pass. These parallel fibers form relatively-weak excitatory synapses - specifically, glutamatergic synapses - connected to the spines of Purkinje cell dendrites, while climbing fibers - originating from the inferior olivary nucleus of the medulla - provide very powerful excitatory input to proximal dendrites and cell soma. Parallel fibers pass orthogonally through the Purkinje neuron's dendritic arbor, with up to 200,000 parallel fibers forming a granule-cell-Purkinje-cell synapse within a single Purkinje cell.

Each adult Purkinje cell receives approximately 500 climbing fiber synapses, collectively originating from a single climbing fiber in the inferior olive, a phenomena which has led to the observation that a "highly conserved one-to-one relationship renders Purkinje dendrites into a single computational compartment". However, observations of murine Purjinke cells have found multi-innervation among a subset of cells comprising multiple primary dendrites - a dendritic motif uncommon in rodents but "predominant" in humans.

Both basket and stellate cells (found in the cerebellar molecular layer) provide inhibitory (GABA-ergic) input to the Purkinje cell. Basket cells synapse on the initial segment of the Purkinje cell axon, while stellate cells synapse to the dendrites.

Purkinje cells send inhibitory projections to the deep cerebellar nuclei, constituting the sole output of all motor coordination in the cerebellar cortex. Purkinje cells also receive feedback signals associated with efference copies from deep cerebellar nuclei, forming an internal feedback loop within the cerebellum that enables recurrent processing.

=== Molecular ===
The Purkinje layer of the cerebellum, which contains the cell bodies of the Purkinje cells and Bergmann glia, express a large number of unique genes. Purkinje-specific gene markers were also proposed by comparing the transcriptome of Purkinje-deficient mice with that of wild-type mice. One illustrative example is the Purkinje cell protein 4 (PCP4) in knockout mice, which exhibit impaired locomotor learning and markedly altered synaptic plasticity in Purkinje neurons. PCP4 accelerates both the association and dissociation of calcium (Ca^{2+}) with calmodulin (CaM) in the cytoplasm of Purkinje cells, and its absence impairs the physiology of these neurons.

=== Development ===
Mammalian embryonic research has detailed the neurogenic origins of Purkinje cells. During early development Purkinje cells arise in the ventricular zone in the neural tube, the nervous system´s precursor in the embryo. All cerebellar neurons derive from germinal neuroepithelia from the ventricular zone. Purkinje cells are specifically generated from progenitors in the ventricular neuroepithelium of the embryonic cerebellar primordium. The first cells generated from the cerebellar primordium form a cap over a diamond-shaped cavity of the developing brain called the fourth ventricle forming the two cerebellar hemispheres. The Purkinje cells that develop later are those of the cerebellum's center-lying section called the vermis. They develop in the cerebellar primordium that covers the fourth ventricle and below a fissure-like region called the isthmus of the developing brain. Purkinje cells migrate toward the outer surface of the cerebellar cortex and form the Purkinje cell layer.

Purkinje cells are born during the earliest stages of cerebellar neurogenesis. Neurogenin2, together with neurogenin1, are transiently expressed in restricted domains of the ventricular neuroepithelium during the time-window of Purkinje cell genesis. This spatio-temporal distribution pattern suggests that neurogenins are involved in the specification of phenotypically heterogeneous Purkinje cell subsets, ultimately responsible for constructing the framework of the cerebellar topography.

There is evidence in mice and humans that bone marrow cells either fuse with or generate cerebellar Purkinje cells, and it is possible that bone marrow cells, either by direct generation or by cell fusion, could play a role in repair of central nervous system damage. Further evidence points yet towards the possibility of a common stem cell ancestor among Purkinje neurons, B-lymphocytes and aldosterone-producing cells of the human adrenal cortex.

== Function ==
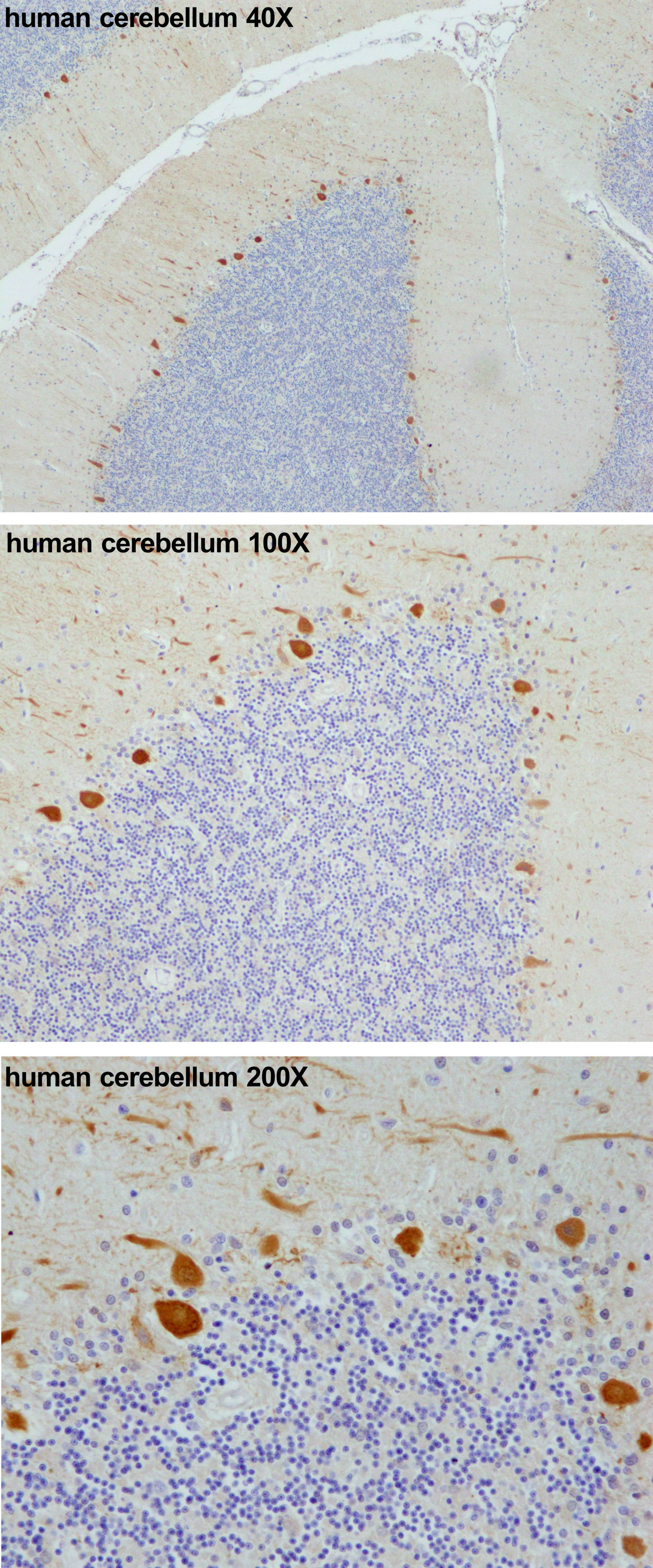
The Purkinje cell protein 4 (PCP4) is markedly immunoreactive in the Purkinje cells of the human cerebellum. From top to bottom 40X, 100X and 200X microscopic magnifications. The immunohistochemistry was performed based on published methods.

Microcircuitry of the cerebellum. Excitatory synapses are denoted by (+) and inhibitory synapses by (-). MF: Mossy fiber DCN: Deep cerebellar nuclei IO: Inferior olive CF: Climbing fiber GC: Granule cell PF: Parallel fiber PC: Purkinje cell GgC: Golgi cell SC: Stellate cell BC: Basket cell

Purkinje cells show two distinct forms of electrophysiological activity:

- Simple spikes occur at rates of 17 – 150 Hz (Raman and Bean, 1999), either spontaneously or when Purkinje cells are activated synaptically by the parallel fibers, the axons of the granule cells.
- Complex spikes are slow, 1–3 Hz spikes, characterized by an initial prolonged large-amplitude spike, followed by a high-frequency burst of smaller-amplitude action potentials. They are caused by climbing fiber activation and can involve the generation of calcium-mediated action potentials in the dendrites. Following complex spike activity, simple spikes can be suppressed by the powerful complex spike input.

Purkinje cells show spontaneous electrophysiological activity in the form of trains of spikes both sodium-dependent and calcium-dependent. This was initially shown by Rodolfo Llinas (Llinas and Hess (1977) and Llinas and Sugimori (1980)). P-type calcium channels were named after Purkinje cells, where they were initially encountered (Llinas et al. 1989), which are crucial in cerebellar function. Activation of the Purkinje cell by climbing fibers can shift its activity from a quiet state to a spontaneously active state and vice versa, serving as a kind of toggle switch. These findings have been challenged by a study suggesting that such toggling by climbing-fiber inputs occurs predominantly in anaesthetized animals and that Purkinje cells in awake behaving animals, in general, operate almost continuously in the upstate. But this latter study has itself been challenged and Purkinje cell toggling has since been observed in awake cats. A computational model of the Purkinje cell has shown intracellular calcium computations to be responsible for toggling.

Findings have suggested that Purkinje cell dendrites release endocannabinoids that can transiently downregulate both excitatory and inhibitory synapses. The intrinsic activity mode of Purkinje cells is set and controlled by the sodium-potassium pump. This suggests that the pump might not be simply a homeostatic, "housekeeping" molecule for ionic gradients. Instead, it could be a computation element in the cerebellum and the brain. Indeed, a mutation in the Na^{+}-K^{+} pump causes rapid onset dystonia parkinsonism; its symptoms indicate that it is a pathology of cerebellar computation. Furthermore, using the poison ouabain to block Na^{+}-K^{+} pumps in the cerebellum of a live mouse induces ataxia and dystonia. Numerical modeling of experimental data suggests that, in vivo, the Na^{+}-K^{+} pump produces long quiescent punctuations (>> 1 s) to Purkinje neuron firing; these may have a computational role. Alcohol inhibits Na^{+}-K^{+} pumps in the cerebellum and this is likely how it corrupts cerebellar computation and body co-ordination.

== Computational models of Purkinje cells. ==
Classic cerebellar computational model proposes that climbing fibers convey teaching signals in the form of prediction error signals to Purkinje cells, which trigger complex spikes and regulate the synaptic strength of parallel fiber-Purkinje cell synapses. Through this mechanism, Purkinje cells adapt cerebellar output to optimize motor performance.

Beyond this error-driven model, an anatomical and functional study identified an internal cerebellar nucleocortical feedback circuit involved in associative motor learning in 2016. In this circuit, deep cerebellar nuclei transmit efference copy signals back to cerebellar cortex through pontine nuclei and mossy fiber pathways, ultimately influencing Purkinje cell activity. In addition to motor learning, its role in prediction and sequence processing was also reported by cerebellar artificial neural network studies of eyeblink conditioning and language.

== Clinical significance ==
In humans, Purkinje cells can be harmed by a variety of causes: toxic exposure, e.g. to alcohol or lithium; autoimmune diseases; genetic mutations causing spinocerebellar ataxias, gluten ataxia, Unverricht-Lundborg disease, or autism; and neurodegenerative diseases that are not known to have a genetic basis, such as the cerebellar type of multiple system atrophy or sporadic ataxias.

Gluten ataxia is an autoimmune disease triggered by the ingestion of gluten. The death of Purkinje cells as a result of gluten exposure is irreversible. Early diagnosis and treatment with a gluten-free diet can improve ataxia and prevent its progression. Less than 10% of people with gluten ataxia present any gastrointestinal symptom, yet about 40% have intestinal damage. It accounts for 40% of ataxias of unknown origin and 15% of all ataxias.

The neurodegenerative disease spinocerebellar ataxia type 1 (SCA1) is caused by an unstable polyglutamine expansion within the Ataxin 1 protein. This defect in Ataxin 1 protein causes impairment of mitochondria in Purkinje cells, leading to premature degeneration of the Purkinje cells. As a consequence, motor coordination declines and eventually death ensues.

Some domestic animals can develop a condition where the Purkinje cells begin to atrophy shortly after birth, called cerebellar abiotrophy. It can lead to symptoms such as ataxia, intention tremors, hyperreactivity, lack of menace reflex, stiff or high-stepping gait, apparent lack of awareness of foot position (sometimes standing or walking with a foot knuckled over), and a general inability to determine space and distance. A similar condition known as cerebellar hypoplasia occurs when Purkinje cells fail to develop in utero or die off before birth.

The genetic conditions ataxia telangiectasia and Niemann Pick disease type C, as well as cerebellar essential tremor, involve the progressive loss of Purkinje cells. In Alzheimer's disease, spinal pathology is sometimes seen, as well as loss of dendritic branches of the Purkinje cells. Purkinje cells can also be damaged by the rabies virus as it migrates from the site of infection in the periphery to the central nervous system.

== See also ==
- List of distinct cell types in the adult human body
