= Equine protozoal myeloencephalitis =

Central nervous system disease of horses

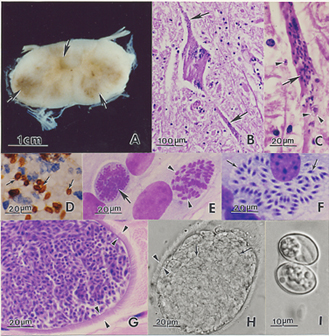
Equine protozoal myeloencephalitis in various stages

Equine protozoal myeloencephalitis (EPM) is a disease that affects the central nervous system of horses. It is caused by a protozoal infection that is brought about by the apicomplexan parasites Sarcocystis neurona or Neospora hughesi. Most cases are caused by S. neurona. The lifecycle and transmission of N. hughesi is not well understood. The parasites create lesions in both the brain and spinal cord of the affected horses leading to neurological issues. Most horses infected with S. neurona do not exhibit neurological symptoms consistent with EPM.

== Causes ==
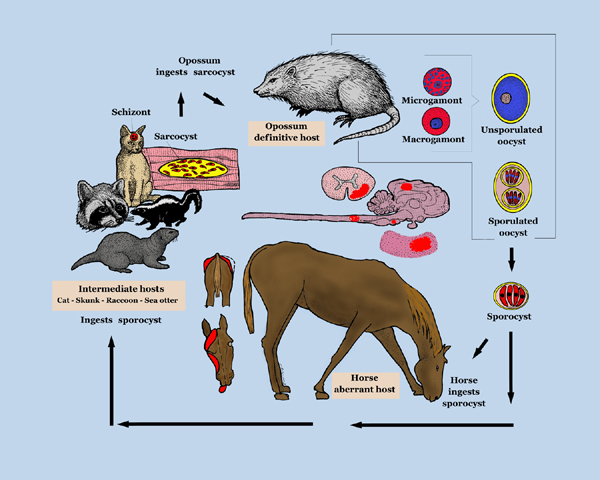
Lifecycle of S. neurona

EPM is caused primarily by the parasite Sarcocystis neurona. To complete its lifecycle, S. neurona requires two hosts: a definitive host, and an intermediate host. The definitive host is the opossum. In North America, the definitive host is the Virginia opossum (Didelphis virginiana); South American opossums can also act as the definitive host.

A number of mammals can serve as intermediate hosts. In the laboratory, raccoons, cats, armadillos, skunks, and sea otters have been shown to be intermediate hosts of S. neurona.

The opossum passes the parasite through feces. Horses contract EPM from contaminated feed or water. Horses cannot pass the disease among themselves; that is, one horse cannot contract the disease from another infected horse. The horse is a dead-end, or aberrant, host of the parasite. Although all horses are believed to be susceptible to EPM the disease is usually found in younger horses typically around three to six years of age. EPM does not typically correlate with other factors such as poor nutrition or other diseases. A study conducted in the US found there was no correlation to the genders of the horses infected nor was there a correlation with the time of year.

Six subspecies of S. neurona can be identified by surface antigens (SAG). Equine EPM is caused by the parasites that exhibit SAG1, SAG5, and SAG6. SAG1 and SAG5 are responsible for the majority of EPM cases in horses. Horses produce antibodies to these surface antigens. Serum antibody testing is available that measures levels of these antibodies in the blood of horses, which is helpful in diagnosing EPM in an ataxic horse. Serial blood levels are helpful in guiding treatment. In experimentally infected horses it takes 14 days from infection to positive antibody tests. 80% of horses with EPM have positive antibody tests. A negative antibody test in the presence of EPM results if testing is done before 17 days or if the horse has been treated with antiprotozoal drugs which delays antibody production.

== Symptoms ==
The onset of EPM can come on suddenly or gradually however once the lesion is created it is extremely hard to reverse the damage. The most common symptoms of EPM are ataxia, general weakness with muscle spasticity. However, this is not specific to EPM and is common in many other neurological disorders. Clinical signs among horses with EPM include a wide array of symptoms that may result from primary or secondary problems. Apparent lameness, particularly atypical lameness or slight gait asymmetry of the rear limbs are commonly caused by EPM. Focal muscle atrophy, or even generalized muscle atrophy or loss of condition may occur. Secondary signs also occur with neurologic disease. Airway abnormalities, such as laryngeal hemiplegia, snoring, or airway noise of undetermined origin may result from damage to the nerves which control the throat, although this is quite uncommon.

In experimentally infected horses, very early signs included loss of appetite, decreased tongue tone, facial paresis, altered mental status, generalized weakness, and lameness.

Sarcocystis neurona is thought to not need to enter the CNS to cause disease, in some cases S. neurona has been found in the CNS, but usually not. In cases where S. neurona is found in the CNS, white blood cells probably play a role in the parasite's penetration of the blood-brain barrier.

== Diagnosis ==
Diagnosing EPM can be challenging because the signs can vary significantly from horse to horse, and the symptoms can be similar to those of other CNS diseases. The only way to definitively diagnose EPM is through post-mortem testing, but there are ways to exclude other diseases and establish a basis for the EPM diagnosis. One method is a neurological examination that assesses the CNS function of the horse. Another option is a cervical radiograph, which can identify any compression in the spinal cord that may cause a horse to lose coordination. A veterinarian can also draw blood and spinal fluid and send it to a lab to confirm if a horse has been exposed to opossum feces. Labs can perform immunodiagnostic testing on spinal fluid to evaluate the production of antibodies that fight against these parasites.

== Treatment and prevention ==
EPM is treatable, but irreversible damage to the nervous system is possible. Identifying the disease as early as possible and beginning treatment with antiprotozoal drugs is important. Currently, three FDA approved treatments are available in the US: ReBalance (sulfadiazine and pyrimethamine), Marquis (ponazuril), and Protazil (diclazuril). These drugs minimize the infection, but do not kill the parasite. The use of anti-inflammatory agents such as banamine, corticosteroids, or phenylbutazone are often used to help reduce inflammation and limit further damage to the CNS. Antioxidants, such as vitamin E, may help promote the restoration of nervous tissue. Response to treatment is often variable, and treatment may be expensive. Recently, antiprotozoal treatments that kill the parasite and clear the infection have shown promise. The inflammatory component is thought responsible for the symptoms of EPM; anti-inflammatory drugs that target the IL-6 pathway have been particularly effective at reversing symptoms. However, there is no vaccine to cure EPM. There are several ways that horse owners can potentially lessen the chances of their horse(s) getting EPM. Some of these preventative measure include proper storage of hay and feed, if possible, not feeding on the ground, reducing wildlife access to stalls and pastures, thoroughly cleaning the horse’s water source often, and prompt disposal of animal carcasses.

== History ==
In the 1960s, a syndrome dubbed "segmental myelitis" was first reported in horses in the US by Rooney and colleagues. Later, in the 1970s, it was recognized by Mayhew and colleagues that the syndrome was associated with an infection by protozoa, and the current name of the disease, "equine protozoal myeloencephalitis", was coined. In 1991, a morphologically distinct parasitic agent was identified in samples taken from horses across the US which had EPM; the parasite was tentatively named Sarcocystis neurona. That same year, S. neurona was isolated from tissue taken from three infected horses. Following identification of the cause of EPM, in 1993 the first test was developed which could identify antibodies to S. neurona in the serum of horses. In 1995, the opossum Didelphis virginiana was first associated with EPM when genetic sequences from S. neurona were found in the opossum's intestinal contents.

The term EPM refers to the clinical neurologic symptoms caused by the parasite, not infection itself.
