= Ventral slot =

Procedure to decompress the spinal cord in veterinary medicine

The ventral slot technique is a procedure that allows the surgeon to reach and decompress the spinal cord and associated nerve roots from a ventral route in veterinary medicine. There are also alternative ways to open the spinal canal from dorsal by performing a hemilaminectomy, but this often gives only limited access. Even when the main pathological changes evolve from the midline, it is necessary to choose a ventral approach.

The ventral slot is commonly performed by splitting the ventral soft tissues of the neck, pushing the great vessels laterally and entering the disc space, securing esophagus and trachea which are located in the midline.

Then taking out the medial part of the disc, leaving the lateral part intact and cutting away a small part of the adjacent vertebrae to extend the gap in a vertical manner. By this way a vertical slot including the upper and lower bone plates next to the disc is created.

This makes possible to decompress the spinal cord from the midline and if necessary to both sides including the leaving nerve roots if also compressed.

If necessary a spacer can be placed in the disc space to prevent the operated segment from collapse or secondary kyphosis. Possible serious complications can be complete or incomplete tetraplegia, pneumonia or unnoticed injury of the esophagus.

== History ==
General data about the discovery and development of the original procedure belong to the British physician Charles Bell who was the first to describe the extent of soft tissue from the ventral into the spinal canal. “It was not until the 1940s that the condition was recognized as a prolapse of the nucleus pulposus.” And it took till 1881 until the first vet, Janson realized a disc extrusion as a classical condition in a dog as the main pathology.

The more detailed descriptions and more precise radiological imaging of the pathologic changes in a dog did not develop until the 1950s. “Hoerlein, Olsson, Hansen, Funquist, and many others contributed significantly to the literature in the 1950s and 1960s, forming the foundations of our current medical and surgical therapies for IVD protrusion” and extrusion. Especial belonging to the surgical technique important advancements in human surgery were made by Robert Robinson, Ralph Cloward and Robert Baily. These basic contributions were taken over to veterinary medicine.

== Uses ==
In veterinary medicine, this is a common procedure to “treat centrally located intervertebral disc herniation”. Veterinary surgeons use the ventral slot technique when the animal shows symptoms of pain and or sensorimotor deficits belonging either to compression of the spinal cord or a single nerve root.

Alternatively, if only a single nerve root is affected it is also possible to release the compressed nerve root via a hemilaminectomy.

== Technique and Risks ==
This surgery is performed on dogs and cats and a meticulous preparation is needed to prevent any damage on the region of the involved part of the neck and vertebral column. The ventral slot procedure is divided into eight main steps. Because the surgeon isn't allowed not to mobilize or shift the spinal cord - otherwise the affected animal is paralyzed afterwards - for any midline pathology an approach from the ventral direction is mandatory. A vertical skin incision is made from the ventral side in the midline, the ventral musculature is split in the midline, vascular structures are retracted laterally, trachea, and esophagus are mobilized across the midline to the opposite side. Attention is paid on any deep nerve structures as the recurrent laryngeal nerve. The goal is to expose the affected disc and the ventral surface of the adjacent two vertebral bodies. During these steps it is important not to break through the lateral border of the disk space, otherwise the vertebral artery could be damaged.

By entering the disk space and taking out its material a slot is created, following the natural orientation of the disc space itself. This can be expanded into adjacent vertebral bodies by staying in the midline. The extent of the slot should not exceed half of the vertebral body - cranial or caudal, but at the same time is providing more surgical room. Through this slot, disc material can be taken out easily until the disc ligament is reached. By removing this ligament the spinal canal finally is opened. By this step and by taking away bone spurs simultaneously the myelon is decompressed. By now working in a laterally orientation the “foraminotomy” starts. During this part the “osteophyte” is removed in “a 180-degree fashion” and the nerve root is free visible. “The foramen is probed with a nerve hook to ensure that the nerve is free”. To decompress a longer part of the cervical canal a corpectomy is performed from one disc to another, just by the same ventral approach.

Because every surgery comes along with some kind of risk, possible complications are an injury of the structures on the way to the disc space (like nerves, trachea and esophagus or vessels), resulting in intraoperative blood loss, apoplexy, postoperative paresis or tetraparesis or pneumonia.

=== Implanted material and effects ===
To avoid collapse across the opened disc space several implants are available. Implanted material can consists of “a cervical disc prosthesis”, a fixed spacer out of metal (titanium) or synthetic material (PEEK). Veterinary medicine is using similar materials as human medicine. Referring to this it is common to insert a cage or allograf. In some cases, the surgeon is using a ventral plate and screws to keep the vertebral bodies together with the implant in position. The main goal of using of a prosthesis is to obtain physiological motion between the two affected vertebral bodies. However, in most cases of myelopathy a secure fusion is attempted. So the compressed myelin will recover after decompression and by time the initial paralysis or sensorimotor deficits will resolve step by step.

== Recovery ==
In general, the animal needs up to 6 weeks for recovery with a normal and positive path of development past surgery if everything goes as planned. During the recovery, statistics have shown that in some cases urinary catheter is needed besides a continuous pain medication. In any doubt of infection especially pneumonia antibiotic therapy should be started early.

Based on actual data dogs receiving physiotherapy which serves the strengthening of the muscles and stimulating the spinal cord functions show a more quickly and better recovery than dogs without such a therapy.

=== Aftercare and adverse effects ===
There is a risk of early infection or damage to the operated vertebrae if the animal moves too quick and uncontrolled. Adverse effects like postoperative paresis or tetraparesis or pneumonia appear in some cases. Depending on the width or lateral extension of the slot some dogs may suffer from subluxation of included vertebrae. One can control the early postoperative course by making sure that the animal stays calm and gets controlled, short walks to prevent the overuse of the fixed and still fusing vertebral segment. To ensure a good recovery and good long-term results “serial neurologic evaluation in the postsurgical patient” are recommended according to the data.

=== Prognosis ===
It is hard to foresee the actual outcome on spinal cord injury even with early surgery due to many important facts like animal breed, age, and size. Statistics have shown that dogs ”with cervical spinal trauma have been reported to have a good prognosis (recovery rate of 82%) if the animal does not suffer from pulmonary complications.” In terms of today's statistical basis surgeons are not able to give a secure prognosis about the outcome of the animal.

== See also ==
- Laminotomy
- Laminectomy
