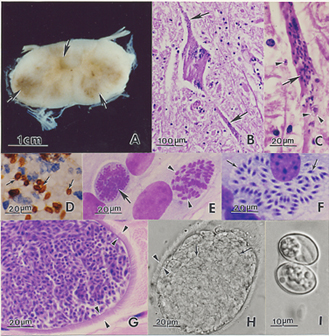
- Sporulated oocyst

Scientific classification
- Domain: Eukaryota
- Supergroup: Alveolata
- Phylum: Apicomplexa
- Class: Conoidasida
- Order: Eucoccidiorida
- Suborder: Eimeriorina
- Family: Sarcocystidae
- Subfamily: Sarcocystinae
- Genus: Sarcocystis
- Species: S. neurona

Binomial name
- Sarcocystis neurona Dubey et al., 1991

= Sarcocystis neurona =

Species of protist

Sarcocystis neurona is primarily a neural parasite of horses and its management is of concern in veterinary medicine. The protozoan Sarcocystis neurona is a protozoan of single celled character and belongs to the family Sarcocystidae, in a group called coccidia. The protozoan, S. neurona, is a member of the genus Sarcocystis, and is most commonly associated with equine protozoal myeloencephalitis (EPM). S. neurona can be easily cultivated and genetically manipulated, hence its common use as a model to study numerous aspects of cell biology.

== Life cycle ==
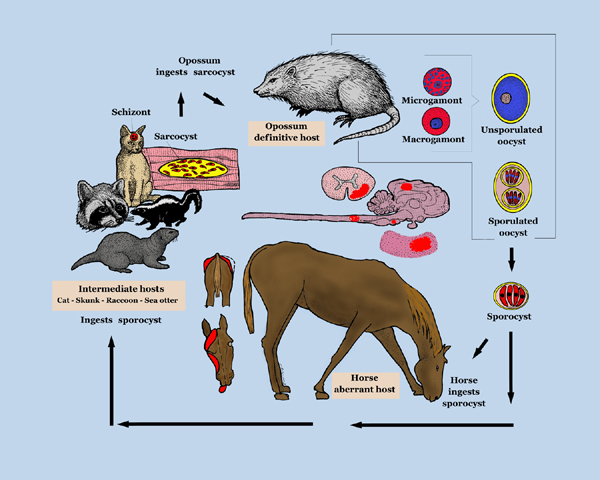
The life cycle of Sarcocystis neurona

Sarcocystis neurona has a wide range of potential intermediate hosts, making it one of the most unique life cycle of the genus Sarcocystis. The life cycle of this parasite requires two hosts, a definitive and an intermediate host. The definitive host of S. neurona are opossums, and more specifically opossums of species Didelphis virginiana and D. albiventris. The full life cycle of S. neurona has yet to be understood, but many advances have been made in fully understanding it after the publication of this subject in 2001 by Dubey. Environmentally resistant oocysts and sporocysts are released into the environment by the definitive hosts' (opossums) feces. Numerous mammals primarily including armadillos, raccoons, sea otters, skunks, and cats serve as intermediate hosts for S. neurona and ingest many sporocysts. After multiple asexual cycles, the sporocysts develop into a resting stage in their muscles called sarcocysts. The sarcocysts produced from the muscles of the intermediate host are ingested by the definitive host and bradyzoites are released in the intestine of the definitive host. The bradyzoites result in sporulated oocysts by undergoing a sexual cycle. The sporulated oocysts are excreted in the feces of the opossum. Horses are aberrant or dead-end hosts, because only schizonts and merozoites have been identified and confined to the brain in spinal cord after a horse has ingested sporocysts in contaminated water and feed. This disease cannot be passed from horse to horse.

== Pathogenesis ==
There are many unanswered questions concerning the development of the disease once this protozoan infects the horse by ingestion of sporocysts in contaminated water and feed. It is presumed that sporocysts release sporozoites that are able to penetrate the intestinal wall and enter arterial endothelial cells within the horse. It is assumed that schizonts develop in these cells until the cell ruptures and merozoites are released into the bloodstream, repeating this stage numerous times to produce large numbers of merozoites. During this stage, no clinical signs may be present, and the infection can be cleared with seropositivity indicating the past infection, or the protozoan can progress to the central nervous system. How S. neurona enters the central nervous system of horses is unknown, but it has been hypothesized that merozoites enter the central nervous system through cytoplasm of endothelial cells or by infected leukocytes. When the merozoite accesses the central nervous system, it is suggested that schizonts form in one or more areas of the CNS including the cerebrum, brainstem, cranial nerves, and/or the spinal cord of the horse. Transmission of the protozoan from the infected horse to other animals is not possible based on the schizonts and daughter merozoites remaining uninfective in the neural tissue. Recent studies suggest that approximately 22–65% of horses in the United States, depending on the geographic location, are seropositive for S. neurona antibodies. Although theories are often developed, the reason explaining why only some horses develop clinical signs of S. neurona and some do not is unknown. Theoretical factors including stress and further unrelated health events are thought to contribute to the onset of this disease. Little is known about the incubation period between exposure to the protozoan and development of clinical disease of Sarcocystis neurona.

== Clinical disease ==
Sarcocystis neurona can parasitize all regions of the central nervous system, including the anterior cerebrum to the end of the spinal cord. Clinical signs of EPM rely on the parasitzing of the CNS. As discussed above, S. neurona schizonts and merozoites are found in the neurons, mononuclear cells, glial cells, and possibly other neural cells. Studies in immune deficient, interferon gamma gene knockout (KO) mice fed S. neurona sporocysts, indicate the Sarcocystis neurona multiplies to a maximum extent in visceral tissue before being transported to the CNS via vehicles discussed above. According to the study, three weeks after infection, S. neuronais primarily confined to the CNS prior to the third week of infection. Early clinical signs of EPM include stumbling and frequent interference, which can often be mistaken for lameness of thoracic and/or pelvic limbs in horses. In horses, the disease often progresses gradually and includes clinical signs such as ataxia. In some horses mild clinical signs may herald a rapidly progressive disease course. The vital signs of infected horses are usually normal during physical examination, although thinning and mild depression may be present. Following a neurological examination asymmetric weakness, spasms and lack of muscle control involving the limbs is revealed. Brain or cranial nerve deficits most frequently observed in horses includes, but are not limited to, depression, head tilt, difficulty swallowing, and facial nerve paralysis. Depending on the location and severity of the lesion, severity of spinal cord damage may lead to an abnormality in walking.

== Diagnosis ==
Although many neurological disorders affect horses, EPM remains the most commonly diagnosed infectious neurological disease in the United States. It is suggested to begin with a complete neurological examination of potentially infected horses to rule out alternative diagnoses. Several serological diagnostic tests have been used to detect antibodies against S. neurona in animals. The first assay developed for detection of antibodies against S. neurona and the diagnosis of EPM was the immunoblot test, also called the Western Blot (WB) test. Development of the WB test over the years has benefited greatly in EPM diagnosis, however the WB technique is mainly a research tool that requires high levels of precision and accuracy. "Second generation" serological assays that are more informative and provide greater throughput have been developed. However, due to EPM only occurring in a small proportion of horses infected with S. neurona, the detection of antibodies against this parasite offers minimal diagnostic value. Antibody detection in cerebrospinal fluid (CSF) offers more insight, but tends to be cofounded by flood contamination during the collection of the sample.

Enzyme-linked immunosorbent assays (ELISAs) are easy to perform, provide a more objective interpretation of the results, and allow for increased throughput testing. ELISAs have been developed based on S. neurona antigens being expressed as recombinant proteins in E. coli. The ELISAs are based on the S. neurona merozoite surface antigens (SnSAGs). The SnSAGs are good targets due to being abundant and immunogenic. All of the SnSAGs are not equally useful in serological assays due to antigenic diversity found in the different strains of S. neurona. Validative studies have proved that the SnSAG ELISAs are specific and do not cross-react with serum from horses infected with other species of Sarcocystis. Surface proteins S. neurona accurately based on their vulnerability as immunologic markers.

== Treatment and prevention ==
Treatment of horses with suspected equine protozoal myeloencephalitis should begin immediately after clinical signs and symptoms of the disease have been recognized and confirmed. Current treatment protocol is using Ponazuril, a highly effective coccidiocidal medication, given once daily for a minimum of 90 days. Ponazuril can be compounded in palatable powder form (molasses, apple or alfalfa flavored) and easily added to a rice bran and chopped carrot mix. Formerly, treatment was confined to dihydrofolate reductase inhibitors including potentiated sulfonamides (such as Bactrim, which is coccidiostatic) and other sulfonamides and pyrimethamine over the years. According to the USDA, usual treatment consisted of an oral dose of 20 mg/kg sulfadiazine once or twice in a day. Affected horses were additionally placed on a dose of 1.0 mg/kg pyrimethamine orally for 120 days or longer. Other coccidiostats are currently being evaluated to treat EPM. So far, Ponazuril remains the most effective coccidiocidal medication for horses, and it is also effectively used "off label" to treat dogs, cats, and other companion animals suffering from seizures related to obligate intracellular coccidian protozoal pathogens (such as Toxoplasma gondii, Neospora caninum, Neospora hughesi, and Sarcocystis neurona). Recommended measures of prevention include proper hygiene and preventing opossums to horse feed and horse grazing pastures.
