= Toltrazuril =

Chemical compound

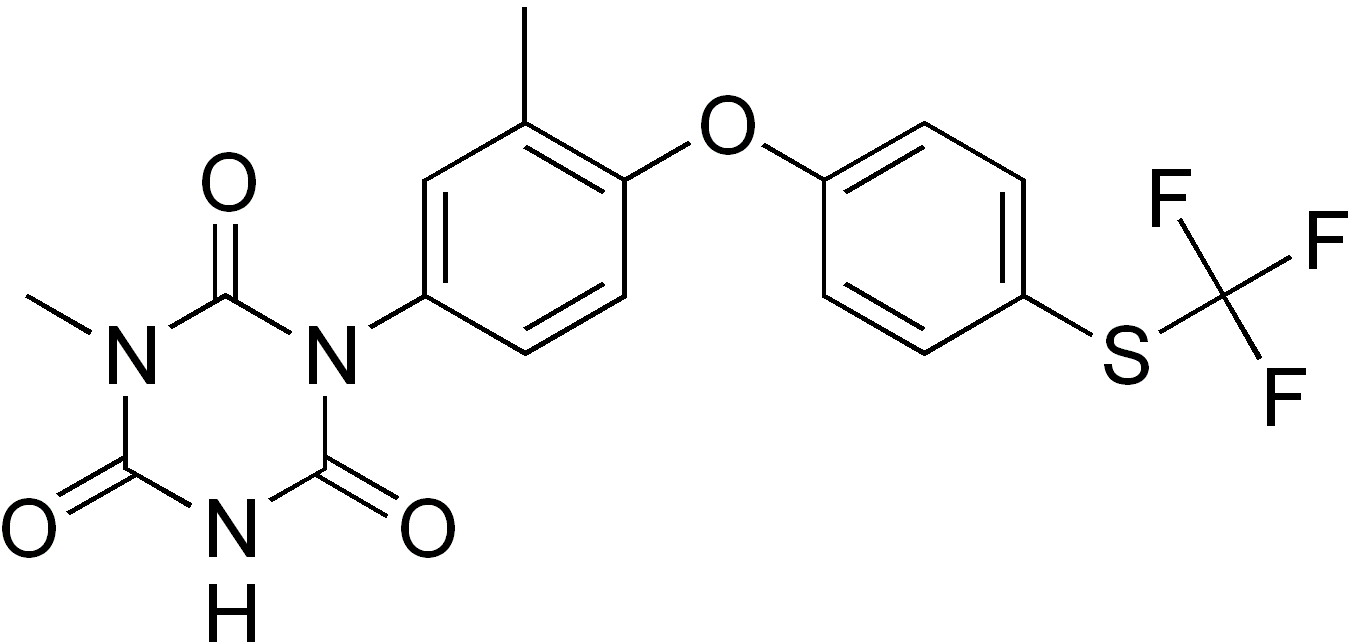

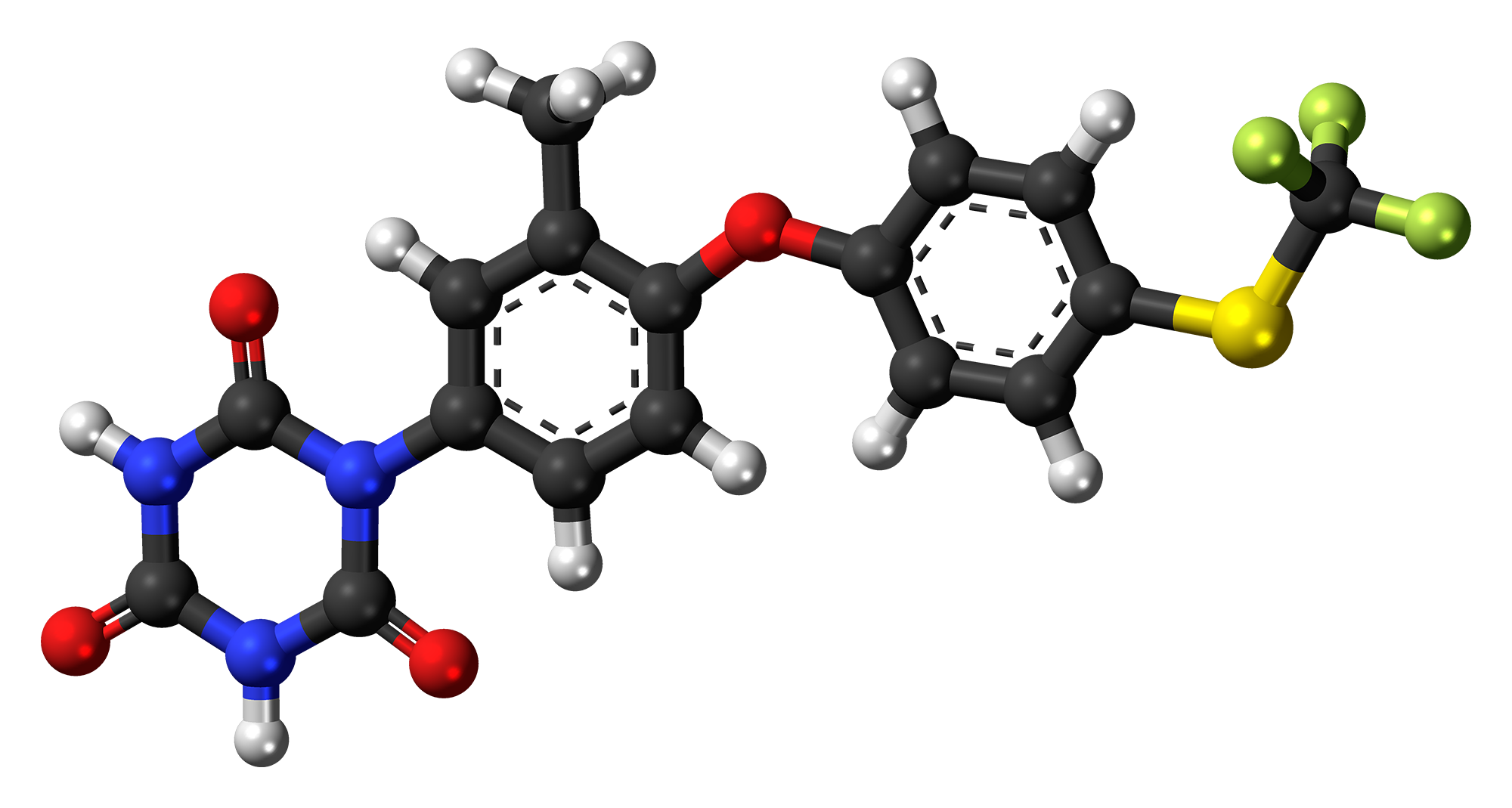

Clinical data
- Trade names: Baycox, Tolcox
- AHFS/Drugs.com: International Drug Names
- ATCvet code: QP51BC01 (WHO) QP51BC51 (WHO)

Legal status
- Legal status: CA: ℞-only

Identifiers
- IUPAC name: 1-methyl-3-[3-methyl-4-[4-(trifluoromethylthio)phenoxy]phenyl]-1,3,5-triazinane-2,4,6-trione
- CAS Number: 69004-03-1
- PubChem CID: 68591
- ChemSpider: 61859
- UNII: QVZ3IAR3JS
- KEGG: D06187
- ChEMBL: ChEMBL2104931
- CompTox Dashboard (EPA): DTXSID90219063
- ECHA InfoCard: 100.132.547

Chemical and physical data
- Formula: C_{18}H_{14}F_{3}N_{3}O_{4}S
- Molar mass: 425.38 g·mol^{−1}
- 3D model (JSmol): Interactive image
- SMILES: CC1=C(C=CC(=C1)N2C(=O)NC(=O)N(C2=O)C)OC3=CC=C(C=C3)SC(F)(F)F
- InChI: InChI=1S/C18H14F3N3O4S/c1-10-9-11(24-16(26)22-15(25)23(2)17(24)27)3-8-14(10)28-12-4-6-13(7-5-12)29-18(19,20)21/h3-9H,1-2H3,(H,22,25,26); Key:OCINXEZVIIVXFU-UHFFFAOYSA-N

Toltrazuril is an antiparasitic medication used primarily to treat coccidiosis in animals. Coccidiosis is a parasitic disease caused by coccidia, which are microscopic, spore-forming, single-celled obligate intracellular parasites belonging to the apicomplexan class Conoidasida.

== Mechanism of action ==
Toltrazuril works by interfering with the protozoa's ability to reproduce. It disrupts the division of the protozoal nucleus and damages the cell membrane of the parasites. This action results in the destruction of the coccidia at all stages of their life cycle.

== Use in veterinary medicine ==
Toltrazuril is widely used in veterinary medicine to treat coccidiosis in various animals, including poultry, pigs, cattle, sheep, and companion animals like dogs and cats. It is often administered as a single dose or in a series of doses depending on the severity of the infection and the species being treated.

== See also ==
- Ponazuril
