= Wilhelm His =

Wilhelm His is the name of:

- Wilhelm His, Sr. (1831–1904), Swiss anatomist
- Wilhelm His, Jr. (1863–1934), Swiss cardiologist, son of Wilhelm His, Sr.
