= Laser microtome =

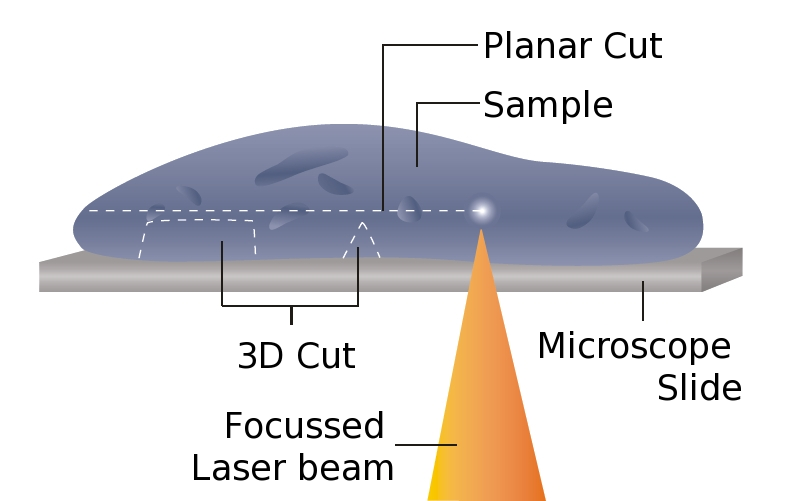
Schematic of laser microtomy principle

The laser microtome is an instrument used for non-contact sectioning of biological tissues or materials. It was developed by the Rowiak GmbH, a spin-off of the Laser Centre, Hannover.

In contrast to mechanically working microtomes, the laser microtome does not require sample preparation techniques such as freezing, dehydration or embedding. It has the ability to slice tissue in its native state. Depending on the material being processed, slice thicknesses of 10 to 100 micrometers are feasible.

== Principle ==
The cutting process is performed by a femtosecond laser, emitting radiation in the near-infrared range. Within this wavelength range, the laser is able to penetrate the tissue up to a certain depth without causing thermal damage. By tight focusing of the laser radiation, intensities over 1 TW/cm^{2} (1 TW = 10^{12} watts) arise inside the laser focus. These extreme intensities induce nonlinear effects and optical breakdown occurs. This causes the disruption of the material, limited to the focal point. The process is known as photodisruption.

Due to the ultra short pulse duration of only a few femtoseconds (1 fs = 10^{−15} seconds) there is only very low energy of a few nanojoules (1 nJ = 10^{−9} joules) per laser pulse deposits into the tissue. This limits the interaction range to diameters below one micrometer (1 μm = 10^{−6} meters). Out of this range there is no thermal damage.

Moved by a fast scanner, the laser beam writes a cutting plane into the sample. A positioning unit moves the sample simultaneously, so that the sample can be processed within a short time.

== See also ==
Laser microdissection
