= Heinrich Werner =

Heinrich Werner may refer to:

- Heinrich Werner, (1906-1945) Wehrmacht sergeant who was an informer to the Saefkow-Jacob-Bästlein Organization
- Heinrich Werner (physician) (1874–1946), German parasitologist
- Heinrich Werner (composer) (1800–1833), composer
- Heinrich Werner (linguist) (fl. c. 2000s), German linguist University of Bonn
