= Trench fever =

Bacterial human disease transmitted by lice

- Other names: Wolhynia fever, shin bone fever, Meuse fever, His disease, and His–Werner disease
- Specialty: Infectious diseases, military medicine
- Symptoms: Fever
- Duration: Five days
- Causes: Infected insect bite
- Prevention: Body hygiene
- Medication: Tetracycline-group antibiotics
- Deaths: Rare

Trench fever (also known as "five-day fever", "quintan fever" (Latin: febris quintana), and "urban trench fever") is a moderately serious infectious disease caused by the bacterium Bartonella quintana and transmitted by body lice. From 1915 to 1918 between one-fifth and one-third of all British troops reported ill had trench fever while about one-fifth of ill German and Austrian troops had the disease. The disease persists among the homeless. Outbreaks have been documented, for example, in Seattle and Baltimore in the United States among injecting drug users and in Marseille, France, and Burundi.

Trench fever is also called Wolhynia fever, shin bone fever, Meuse fever, His disease, and His–Werner disease or Werner-His disease (after Wilhelm His Jr. and Heinrich Werner).

== Signs and symptoms ==
The disease is classically a five-day fever of the relapsing type, rarely exhibiting a continuous course. The incubation period is relatively long, at about two weeks. The onset of symptoms is usually sudden, with high fever, severe headache, pain on moving the eyeballs, soreness of the muscles of the legs and back, and frequent hyperaesthesia of the shins. The initial fever is usually followed in a few days by a single, short rise, but there may be many relapses between periods without fever. The most constant symptom is pain in the legs. Trench fever episodes may involve loss of appetite, shin pain or tenderness, and spleen enlargement. Generally, one to five periodic episodes of fever occur, separated by four-to six-day-long asymptomatic periods. Recovery takes a month or more. Lethal cases are rare, but in a few cases, "the persistent fever might lead to heart failure". Aftereffects may include neurasthenia, cardiac disturbances, and myalgia.

== Cause, transmission, pathophysiology ==
The disease is caused by the bacterium Bartonella quintana (older names: Rochalimea quintana, Rickettsia quintana), found in the stomach walls of the body louse. Bartonella quintana is closely related to Bartonella henselae, the agent of cat scratch fever and bacillary angiomatosis.

Bartonella quintana is transmitted by contamination of a skin abrasion or louse-bite wound with the faeces of an infected body louse (Pediculus humanus corporis). There have also been reports of an infected louse bite passing on the infection. B. quintana infection has also been noted in transplant recipients from infected donors.

== Diagnosis ==
Bartonella quintana diagnosis based on clinical recognition is typically obtained using microbiologic cultures, polymerase chain reaction (PCR) identification, and serological tests.

It is difficult to culture B. quintana because it is a slow-growing, fastidious bacterium with complex nutritional needs and slow growth rates, often requiring specialized culture conditions. In cases with a high likelihood of disease, cultures may be obtained using Ethylenediaminetetraacetic acid (EDTA) bottles or Chocolate agar under 5% CO_{2} incubated at 35 °C and held for at least 21 days.

Due to its slow growth rate, other molecular diagnosis methods can be utilized, such as polymerase chain reaction (PCR), to detect B. quintana DNA in samples of blood or tissue. According to Zeaiter et al., “species-specific reverse-transcriptase polymerase chain reaction (RT PCR) was compared to serology” and helped diagnose all three Bartonella species (Okorji O et al., 2025).

B. quintana may be diagnosed by serology or the detection of antibodies against Bartonella bacteria in blood serum. Antibodies to B. quintana can be measured with an indirect fluorescence assay (IFA) or an enzyme-linked immunosorbent assay (ELISA). Serology tests can help identify current and past exposures to Bartonella species. Using serology, acute infections can be differentiated from chronic infections based on higher elevations of anti-Bartonella antibodies in those acute infections (Okorji O et al., 2025). Serology has been recorded to be most sensitive in cases with endocarditis (infection of the inner lining of the heart chambers and valves).

== Treatment ==
The treatment of trench fever can vary from case to case, as the human body can rid itself of the disease without medical intervention. Some affected individuals will require treatment, and others will not. For those who do require treatment, the best treatment comes by way of doxycycline in combination with gentamicin. Chloramphenicol is an alternative medication recommended under circumstances that render the use of tetracycline derivatives undesirable, such as severe liver disease, kidney dysfunction, in children under nine years, and pregnant women. The medication is administered for seven to ten days.

Treatment usually consists of a 4- to 6-week course of doxycycline as first-line, or erythromycin, or azithromycin.

== Epidemiology ==
Trench fever is a vector-borne disease in which humans are the main hosts. The vector through which the disease is typically transmitted is referred to as the human body louse Pediculus humanus humanus. The British Expeditionary Force Pyrexia of Unknown Origin Enquiry Sub-Committee concluded that the specific means by which the vector infected the host was louse waste entering the body through abraded skin. Although the disease is typically found in humans, the gram-negative bacterium which induces the disease has been seen in mammals such as dogs, cats, and macaques in small numbers.

Since the vector of the disease is a human body louse, the main risk factors for infection are mostly related to contracting the body louse. Specifically, some risk factors include body louse infestation, overcrowded and unhygienic conditions, poor body hygiene, war, famine, malnutrition, alcoholism, homelessness, and intravenous drug abuse.

The identified risk factors directly correlate with the subpopulations of identified infected persons throughout the duration of the known disease. Historically, trench fever was found in young male soldiers of World War I, whereas in the 21st century, the disease mostly has a prevalence in middle-aged homeless men. In a 2021 outbreak investigation in Denver, Colorado, 15% of the 241 tested homeless persons were positive. A 2012 study in Marseille, France had found the bacterium in 5.4% of the 930 homeless individuals they tested.

== History ==
Trench fever affected armies in Flanders, France, Poland, Galicia, Italy, Macedonia, Mesopotamia, Russia and Egypt in World War I. Three noted cases during WWI were the authors J. R. R. Tolkien, A. A. Milne, and C. S. Lewis.

=== Discovery and taxonomy ===
Trench fever was first described and reported by British Major John Graham in June 1915. He reported symptoms such as dizziness, headaches, and pain in the shins and back. The disease was most common in the military and consequently took much longer to identify than usual. These cases were originally confused for dengue, sandfly, or paratyphoid fever. Because insects were the suspected vector of transmission, Alexander Peacock published a study of the body louse in 1916. Due in part to his findings, the louse was determined to be the primary cause of transmission by many, but this was still contested by multiple voices in the field, such as John Muir, who believed the disease was viral. In 1917, the Trench Fever Investigation Commission (TFIC) had its first meeting. The TFIC performed experiments with infected blood and lice and learned much about the disease and louse behavior. Also in 1917, the American Red Cross started the Medical Research Committee (MRC). The MRC performed human experiments on trench fever, and their research was published in March 1918. The MRC and TFIC findings were very similar, essentially confirming the louse as the vector of transmission. The TFIC correctly implicated louse fecal contamination as the mode of transmission, rather than directly through louse bite.

The TFIC speculated that the disease was "likely" related to a rickettsial infection based on studies of infected lice, and the bacterium had been named by Schmincke one year prior in 1917.

It was not until the 1960s that J. Vinson demonstrated that Rickettsia quintana could be cultured extracellularly on blood agar and fulfilled Koch's postulates. This led to the reclassification of Rickettsia quintana as Rochalimaea quintana and subsequently Bartonella quintana.

During World War II, the British Government commissioned sheep dip manufacturer Cooper, McDougall & Robertson of Berkhamsted, Herts, to develop a product which troops could use to ward off lice. After much trial and error, 'AL63' was developed and successfully used in a powder form. The initials stood for 'Anti-Louse', and it was the 63rd preparation which was the most efficacious.
