= Microtome =

Tool to cut fine samples for microscopy

A microtome (from the Greek mikros, meaning "small", and temnein, meaning "to cut") is a cutting tool used to produce extremely thin slices of material known as sections, with the process being termed microsectioning. Important in science, microtomes are used in microscopy for the preparation of samples for observation under transmitted light or electron radiation.

Microtomes use steel, glass or diamond blades depending upon the specimen being sliced and the desired thickness of the sections being cut. Steel blades are used to prepare histological sections of animal or plant tissues for light microscopy. Glass knives are used to slice sections for light microscopy and to slice very thin sections for electron microscopy. Industrial grade diamond knives are used to slice hard materials such as bone, teeth and tough plant matter for both light microscopy and for electron microscopy. Gem-quality diamond knives are also used for slicing thin sections for electron microscopy.

Microtomy is a method for the preparation of thin sections for materials such as bones, minerals and teeth, and an alternative to electropolishing and ion milling. Microtome sections can be made thin enough to section a human hair across its breadth, with section thickness between 50 nm and 100 μm.

== History ==
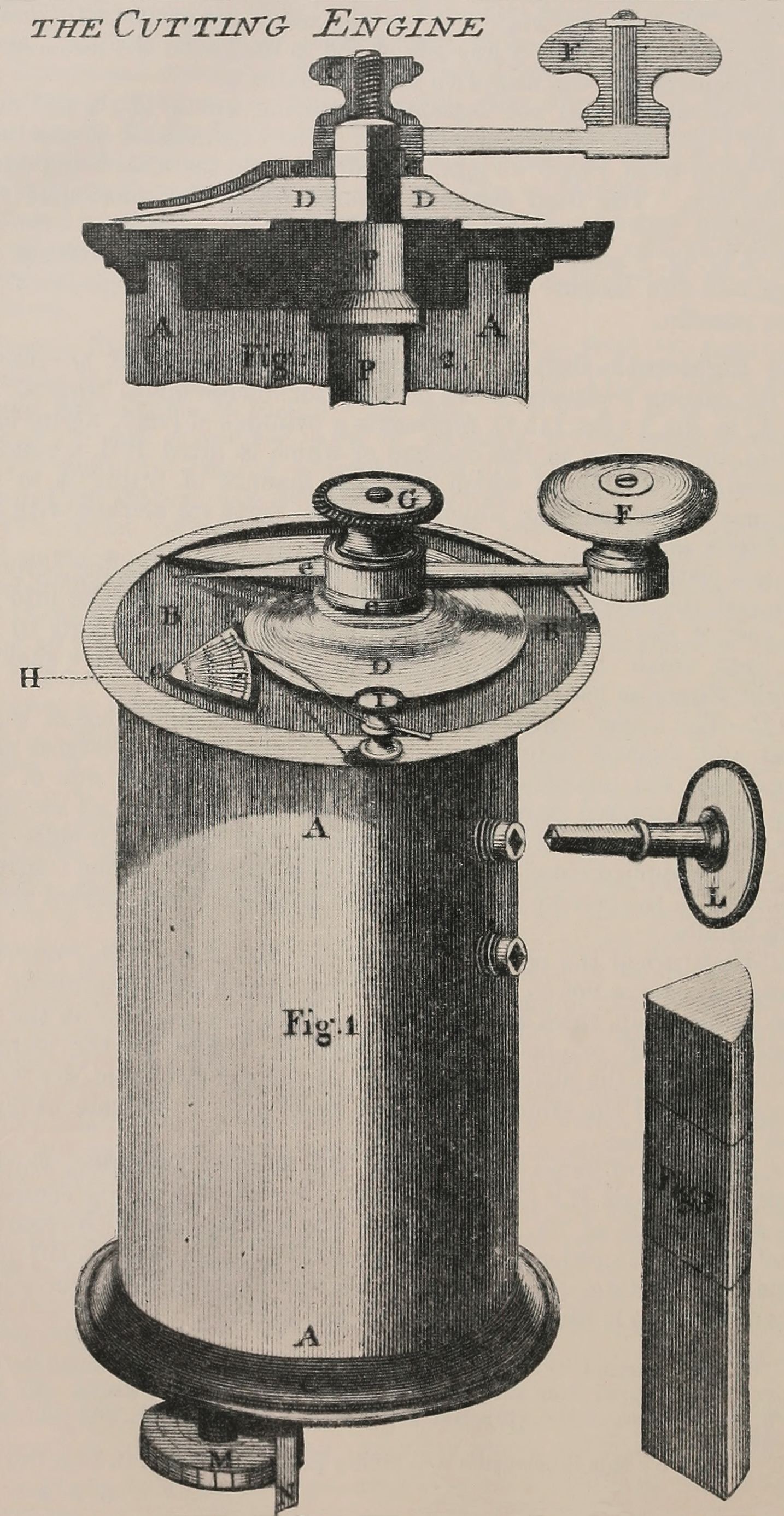
A diagram of a microtome drawn by Cummings in 1770

In the beginnings of light microscope development, sections from plants and animals were manually prepared using razor blades. It was found that to observe the structure of the specimen under observation it was important to make clean reproducible cuts on the order of 100 μm, through which light can be transmitted. This allowed for the observation of samples using light microscopes in a transmission mode.

One of the first devices for the preparation of such cuts was invented in 1770 by George Adams, Jr. (1750–1795) and further developed by Alexander Cummings. The device was hand operated, and the sample held in a cylinder and sections created from the top of the sample using a hand crank.

In 1835, Andrew Prichard developed a table based model which allowed for the vibration to be isolated by affixing the device to the table, separating the operator from the knife.

Occasionally, attribution for the invention of the microtome is given to the anatomist Wilhelm His, Sr. (1865). In his Beschreibung eines Mikrotoms (German for Description of a Microtome), Wilhelm wrote:

The apparatus has enabled a precision in work by which I can achieve sections that by hand I cannot possibly create. Namely it has enabled the possibility of achieving unbroken sections of objects in the course of research.

Other sources further attribute the development to a Czech physiologist Jan Evangelista Purkyně. Several sources describe the Purkyne model as the first in practical use.

The obscurities in the origins of the microtome are due to the fact that the first microtomes were simply cutting apparatuses, and the developmental phase of early devices is widely undocumented.

At the end of the 1800s, the development of very thin and consistently thin samples by microtomy, together with the selective staining of important cell components or molecules, allowed for the visualisation of microscopic details.

Today, the majority of microtomes are a knife-block design with a changeable knife, a specimen holder and an advancement mechanism. In most devices the cutting of the sample begins by moving the sample over the knife, where the advancement mechanism automatically moves forward such that the next cut for a chosen thickness can be made. The section thickness is controlled by an adjustment mechanism, allowing for precise control.

== Applications ==
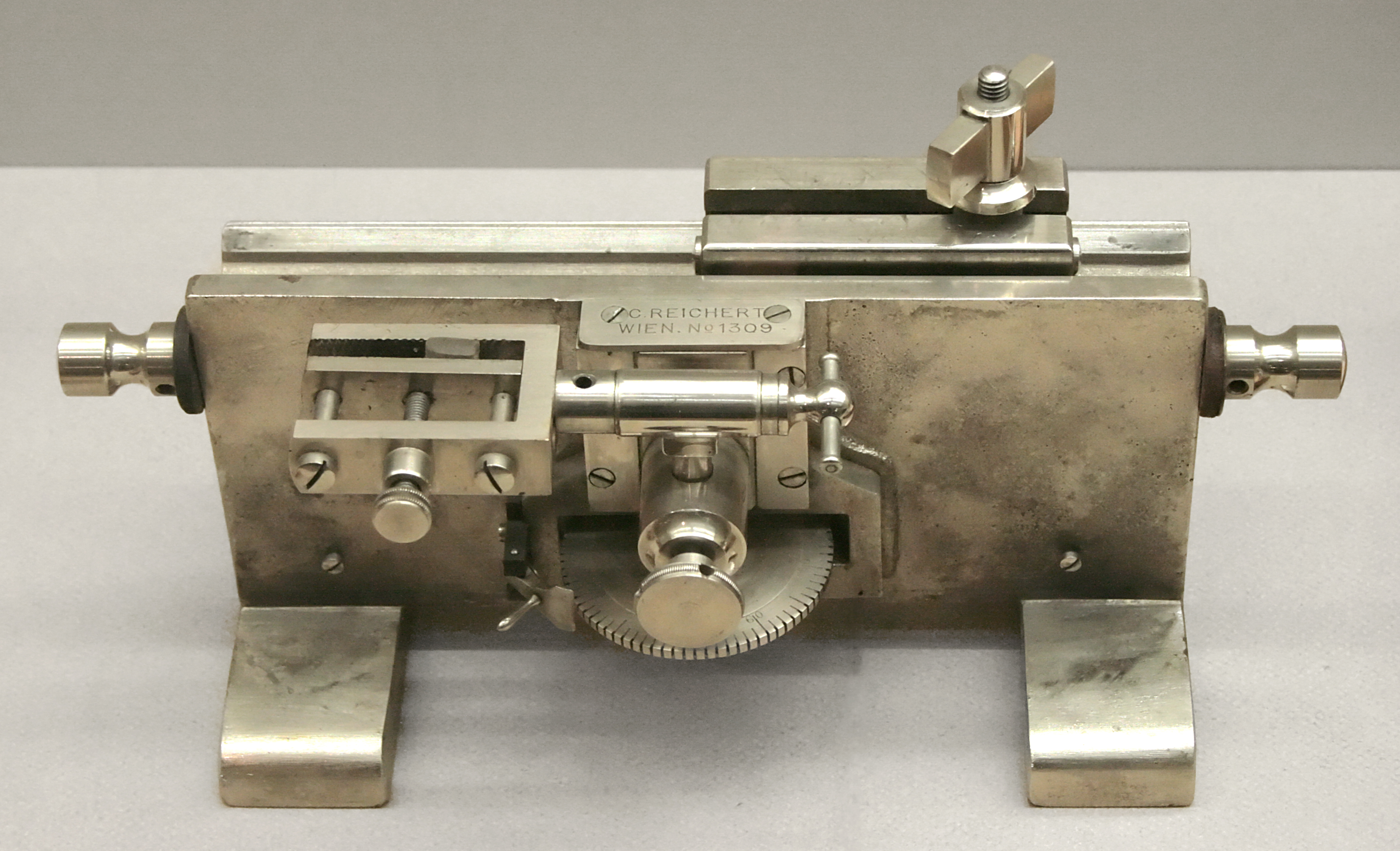
Microtome (C. Reichert, Vienna, 1905–1915)

The most common applications of microtomes are:

- Traditional Histology Technique: tissues are fixed, dehydrated, cleared, and embedded in melted paraffin, which when cooled forms a solid block. The tissue is then cut in the microtome at thicknesses varying from 2 to 50 μm. From there the tissue can be mounted on a microscope slide, stained with appropriate aqueous dye(s) after removal of the paraffin, and examined using a light microscope.
- Frozen section procedure: water-rich tissues are hardened by freezing and cut in the frozen state with a freezing microtome or microtome-cryostat; sections are stained and examined with a light microscope. This technique is much faster than traditional histology (5 minutes vs 16 hours) and is used in conjunction with medical procedures to achieve a quick diagnosis. Cryosections can also be used in immunohistochemistry as freezing tissue stops degradation of tissue faster than using a fixative and does not alter or mask its chemical composition as much.
- Electron Microscopy Technique: after embedding tissues in epoxy resin, a microtome equipped with a glass or gem grade diamond knife is used to cut very thin sections (typically 60 to 100 nanometer). Sections are stained with an aqueous solution of an appropriate heavy metal salt and examined with a transmission electron microscope. This instrument is often called an ultramicrotome. The ultramicrotome is also used with its glass knife or an industrial grade diamond knife to cut survey sections prior to thin sectioning. These survey sections are generally 0.5 to 1 μm thick and are mounted on a glass slide and stained to locate areas of interest under a light microscope prior to thin sectioning for the TEM. Thin sectioning for the TEM is often done with a gem quality diamond knife. Complementing traditional TEM techniques ultramicrotomes are increasingly found mounted inside an SEM chamber so the surface of the block face can be imaged and then removed with the microtome to uncover the next surface for imaging. This technique is called serial block-face scanning electron microscopy (SBFSEM).
- Botanical Microtomy Technique: hard materials like wood, bone and leather require a sledge microtome. These microtomes have heavier blades and cannot cut as thin as a regular microtome.
- Spectroscopy (especially FTIR or infrared spectroscopy) Technique: thin polymer sections are needed in order that the infra-red beam can penetrate the sample under examination. It is normal to cut samples to between 20 and 100 μm in thickness. For more detailed analysis of much smaller areas in a thin section, FTIR microscopy can be used for sample inspection.
- Fabricating nanofluidic devices: Ultramicrotomy was recently used to fabricate nanofluidic channels for biosensing applications. . This precise and straightforward method enabled the sustainable production of several hundred molybdenum disulfide (MoS2) based 2D nano-slits with identical cross-sectional dimensions and tunable lengths from layered crystals.This also calculated a constant for deviation from empirical Hooge's law, and used for DNA sensing application.

A recent development is the laser microtome, which cuts the target specimen with a femtosecond laser instead of a mechanical knife. This method is contact-free and does not require sample preparation techniques. The laser microtome has the ability to slice almost every tissue in its native state. Depending on the material being processed, slice thicknesses of 10 to 100 μm are feasible.

Sectioning intervals can be classified mainly into either:

- Serial sectioning: obtaining a continuous ribbon of sections from a paraffin block and using all for slides.
- Step sections: collected at specified depths in the block.

=== Precision cut kidney slices ===
Precision-cut kidney slices refer to thin sections of the kidney tissue that are prepared using a microtome to study kidney functions, drug metabolism or disease processes. Researchers use these slices to study the impact of substances on renal function. This includes drug metabolism and the effects of toxic substances.

== Types ==
=== Sledge ===
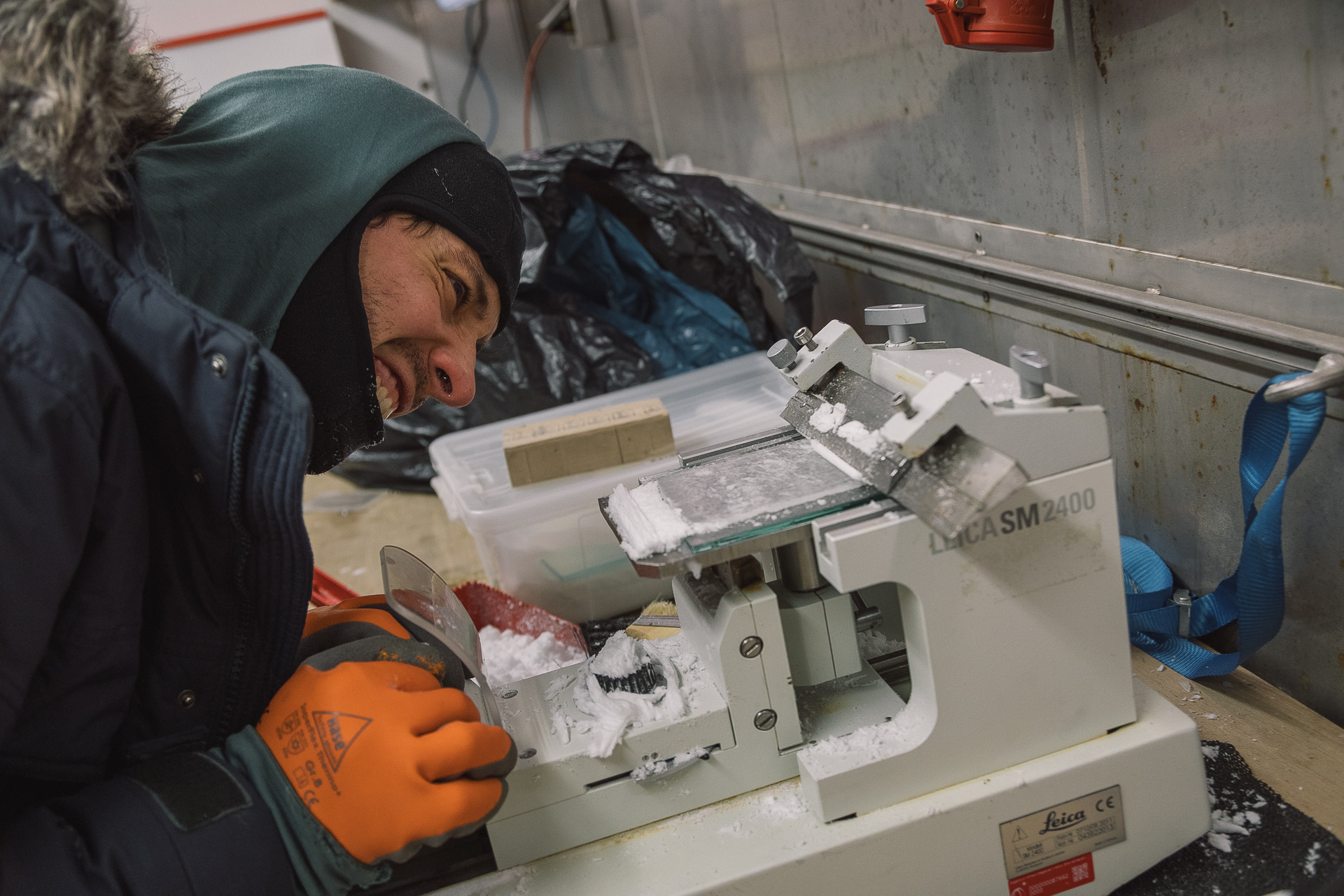
A sled microtome used for thin section of sea ice

A sledge microtome is a device where the sample is placed into a fixed holder (shuttle), which then moves backwards and forwards across a knife. Modern sled microtomes have the sled placed upon a linear bearing, a design that allows the microtome to readily cut many coarse sections. By adjusting the angles between the sample and the microtome knife, the pressure applied to the sample during the cut can be reduced. Typical applications for this design of microtome are the preparation of large samples, such as those embedded in paraffin for biological preparations. Typical cut thickness achievable on a sledge microtome is between 1 and 60 μm.

=== Rotary ===
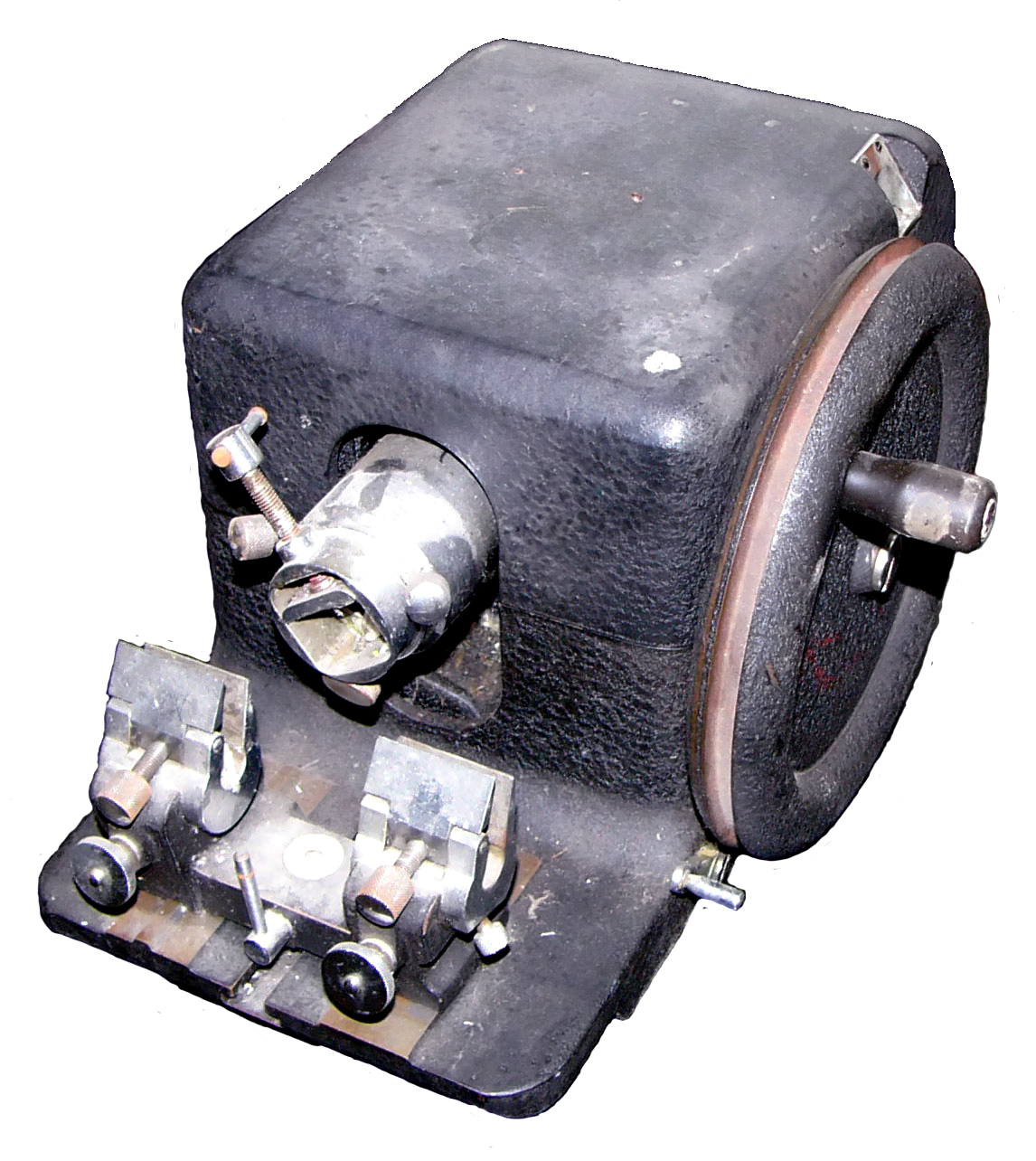
A rotary microtome of older construction

This instrument is a common microtome design. This device operates with a staged rotary action such that the actual cutting is part of the rotary motion. In a rotary microtome, the knife is typically fixed in a vertical position, and the tissue block goes up and down into the blade, cutting the block into thin sections.

Principle of sample movement for making a cut on a rotary microtome

In the figure to the left, the principle of the cut is explained. Through the motion of the sample holder, the sample is cut by the knife position 1 to position 2, at which point the fresh section remains on the knife. At the highest point of the rotary motion, the sample holder is advanced by the same thickness as the section that is to be made, allowing the next section to be made.

The flywheel in many microtomes can be operated by hand. This has the advantage that a clean cut can be made, as the relatively large mass of the flywheel prevents the sample from being stopped during the sample cut. The flywheel in newer models is often integrated inside the microtome casing. The typical cut thickness for a rotary microtome is between 1 and 60 μm. For hard materials, such as a sample embedded in a synthetic resin, this design of microtome can allow good "semi-thin" sections with a thickness of as low as 0.5 μm.

=== Cryomicrotome ===
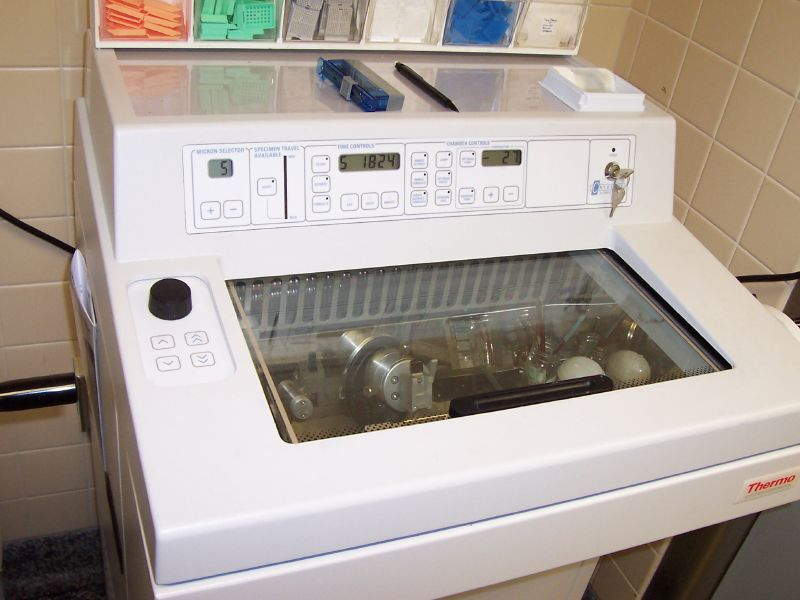
A cryomicrotome

For the cutting of frozen samples, many rotary microtomes can be adapted to cut in a liquid-nitrogen chamber, in a so-called cryomicrotome setup. The reduced temperature allows the hardness of the sample to be increased, such as by undergoing a glass transition, which allows the preparation of semi-thin samples. However the sample temperature and the knife temperature must be controlled in order to optimise the resultant sample thickness.

=== Ultramicrotome ===
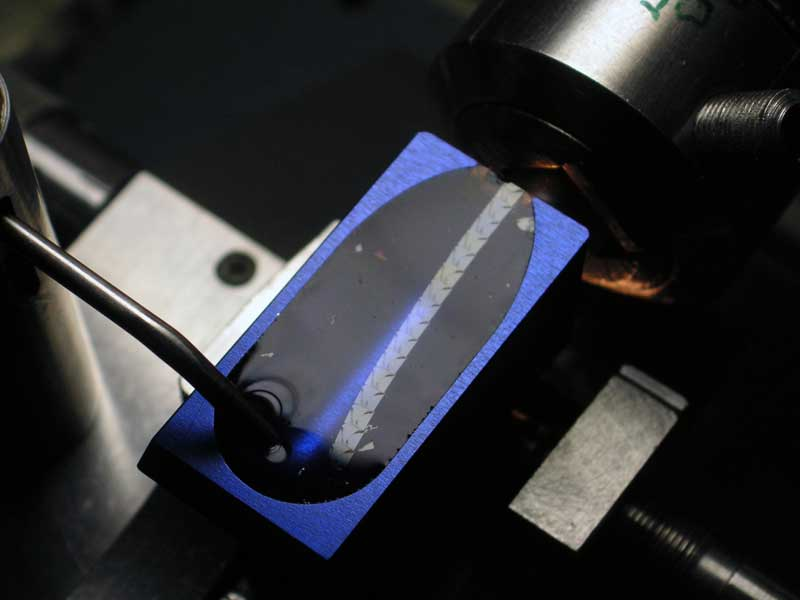
A ribbon of ultrathin sections prepared by room-temperature ultramicrotomy, floating on water in the boat of a diamond knife used to cut the sections. The knife blade is the edge at the upper end of the trough of water.

An ultramicrotome is a main tool of ultramicrotomy. It allows the preparation of extremely thin sections, with the device functioning in the same manner as a rotational microtome, but with very tight tolerances on the mechanical construction. As a result of the careful mechanical construction, the linear thermal expansion of the mounting is used to provide very fine control of the thickness.

These extremely thin cuts are important for use with transmission electron microscope (TEM) and serial block-face scanning electron microscopy (SBFSEM), and are sometimes also important for light-optical microscopy. The typical thickness of these cuts is between 40 and 100 nm for transmission electron microscopy and often between 30 and 50 nm for SBFSEM. Thicker sections up to 500 nm thick are also taken for specialized TEM applications or for light-microscopy survey sections to select an area for the final thin sections. Diamond knives (preferably) and glass knives are used with ultramicrotomes. To collect the sections, they are floated on top of a liquid as they are cut and are carefully picked up onto grids suitable for TEM specimen viewing. The thickness of the section can be estimated by the thin-film interference colors of reflected light that are seen as a result of the extremely low sample thickness.

=== Vibrating ===
The vibrating microtome operates by cutting using a vibrating blade, allowing the resultant cut to be made with less pressure than would be required for a stationary blade. The vibrating microtome is usually used for difficult biological samples. The cut thickness is usually around 30–500 μm for live tissue and 10–500 μm for fixed tissue.

=== Saw ===
The saw microtome is especially for hard materials such as teeth or bones. The microtome of this type has a recessed rotating saw, which slices through the sample. The minimal cut thickness is approximately 30 μm and can be made for comparatively large samples.

=== Laser ===
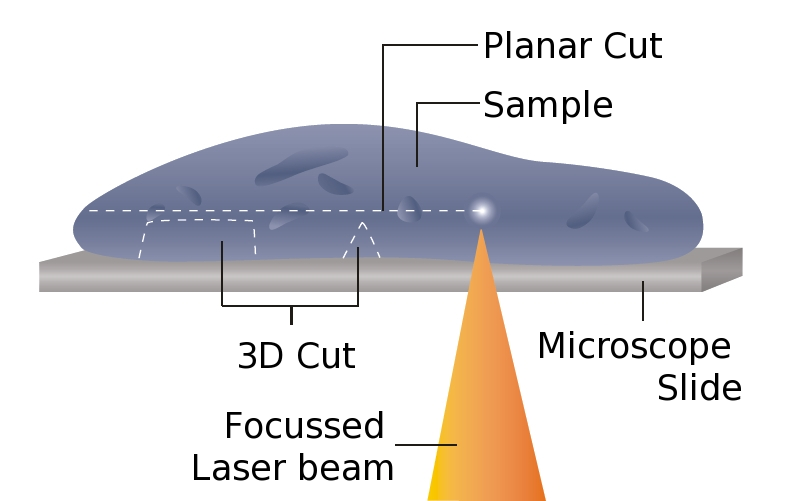
A conceptual diagram of laser microtome operation

The laser microtome is an instrument for contact-free slicing. Prior preparation of the sample through embedding, freezing or chemical fixation is not required, thereby minimizing the artifacts from preparation methods. Alternately this design of microtome can also be used for very hard materials, such as bones or teeth, as well as some ceramics. Dependent upon the properties of the sample material, the thickness achievable is between 10 and 100 μm.

The device operates using a cutting action of an infrared laser. As the laser emits a radiation in the near infrared, in this wavelength regime the laser can interact with biological materials. Through sharp focusing of the probe within the sample, a focal point of very high intensity, up to TW/cm^{2}, can be achieved. Through the non-linear interaction of the optical penetration in the focal region a material separation in a process known as photo-disruption is introduced. By limiting the laser pulse durations to the femtoseconds range, the energy expended at the target region is precisely controlled, thereby limiting the interaction zone of the cut to under a micrometre. External to this zone the ultra-short beam application time introduces minimal to no thermal damage to the remainder of the sample.

The laser radiation is directed onto a fast scanning mirror-based optical system, which allows three-dimensional positioning of the beam crossover, whilst allowing beam traversal to the desired region of interest. The combination of high power with a high raster rate allows the scanner to cut large areas of sample in a short time. In the laser microtome the laser-microdissection of internal areas in tissues, cellular structures, and other types of small features is also possible.

== Knives ==
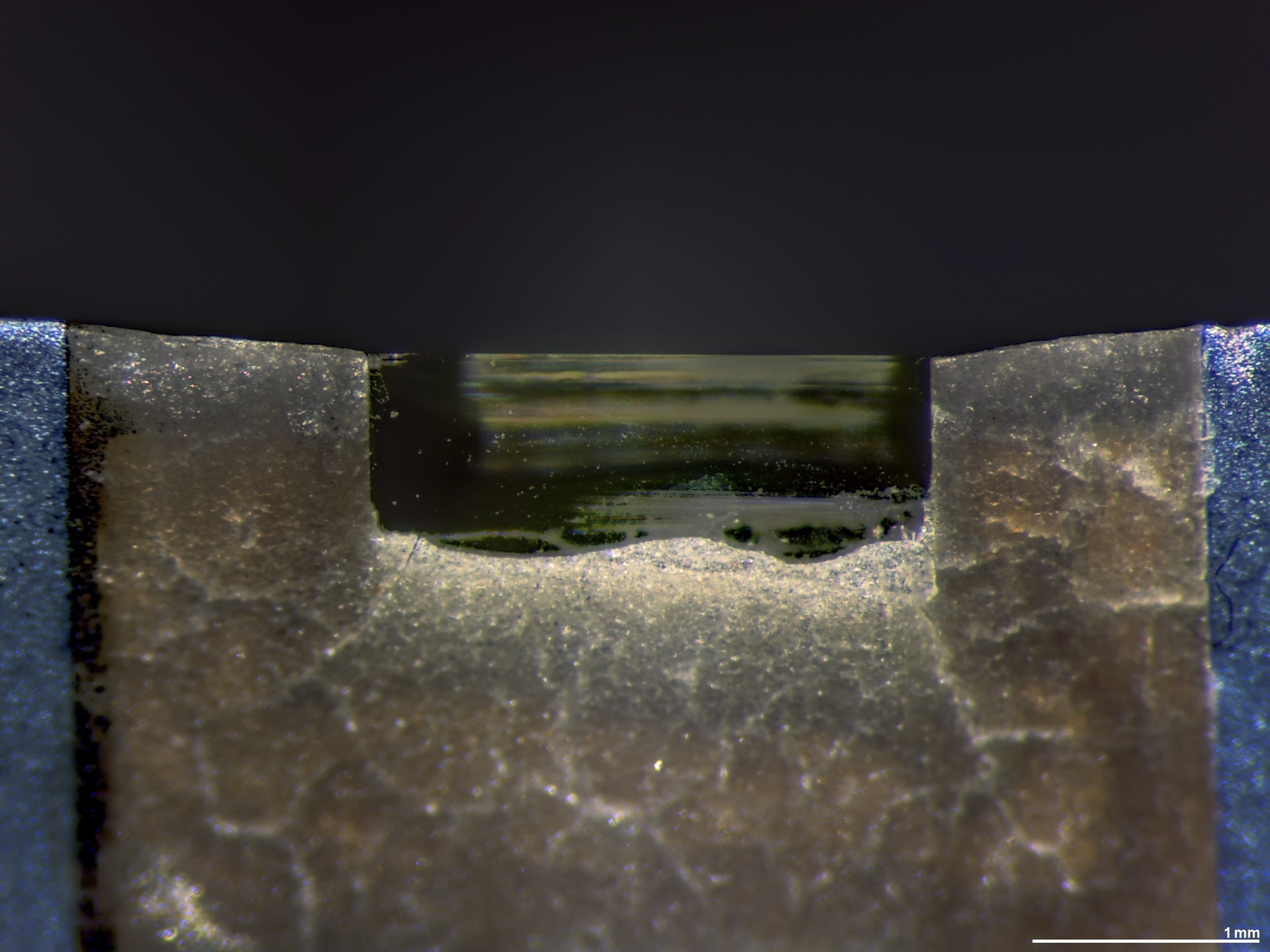
A diamond knife blade used for cutting ultrathin sections (typically 70 to 350 nm) for transmission electron microscopy

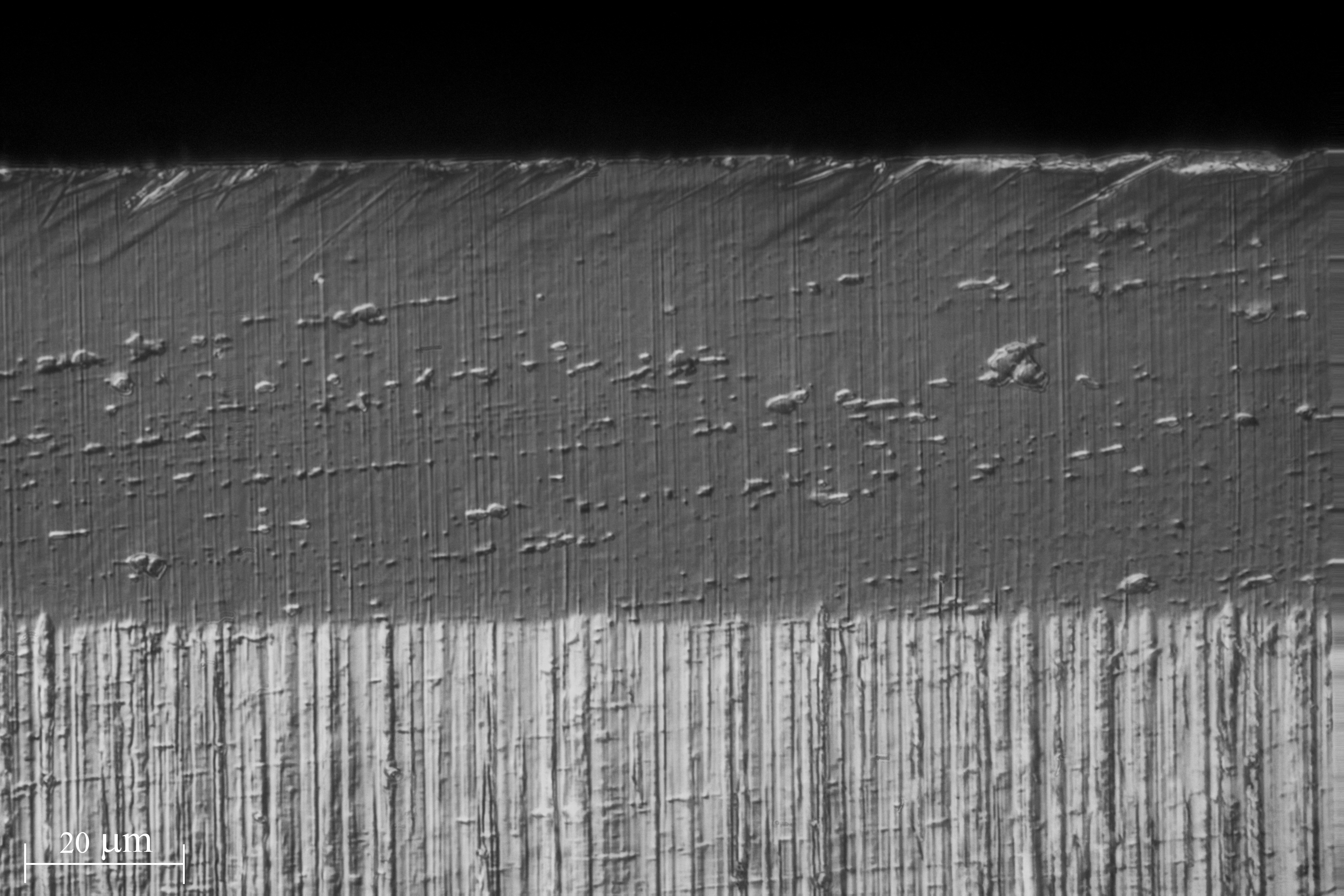
The cutting edge of a disposable blade for a microtome under a microscope

The selection of microtome knife blade profile depends upon the material and preparation of the samples, as well as the final sample requirements (e.g. cut thickness and quality).

=== Design and cut types ===
Profiles of microtome knives

Generally, knives are characterized by the profile of the knife blade, which falls under the categories of planar concave, wedge shaped or chisel shaped designs.

Planar concave microtome knives are extremely sharp, but are also very delicate and are therefore only used with very soft samples. The wedge profile knives are somewhat more stable and find use in moderately hard materials, such as in epoxy or cryogenic sample cutting. Finally, the chisel profile, with its blunt edge, raises the stability of the knife, whilst requiring significantly more force to achieve the cut.

For ultramicrotomes, glass and diamond knives are required; the cut breadth of the blade is therefore on the order of a few millimetres and is therefore significantly smaller than for classical microtome knives. Glass knives are usually manufactured by the fracture of glass bars using special "knife-maker" fracturing devices. Glass knives may be used for initial sample preparations even where diamond knives may be used for final sectioning. Glass knives usually have small troughs, made with plastic tape, which are filled with water to allow the sample to float for later collection. Diamond blades may be built into such an existing trough, allowing for the same collection method.

=== Sectioning ===
Prior to cutting by microtome, biological materials are usually placed in a more rigid fixative, in a process known as embedding. This is achieved by the inflow of a liquid substance around the sample, such as paraffin (wax) or epoxy, which is placed in a mold and later hardened to produce a "block" which is readily cut.

The declination is the angle of contact between the sample vertical and knife blade. If the knife blade is at right angles (declination=90) the cut is made directly using a pressure based mode, and the forces are therefore proportionally larger. If the knife is tilted, however, the relative motion of the knife is increasingly parallel to sample motion, allowing for a slicing action. This behaviour is very important for large or hard samples.

The inclination of the knife is the angle between the knife face and the sample. For an optimal result, this angle must be chosen appropriately. The optimal angle depends upon the knife geometry, the cut speed and many other parameters. If the angle is adjusted to zero, the knife cut can often become erratic, and a new location of the knife must be used to smooth this out.

If the angle is too large, the sample can crumple and the knife can induce periodic thickness variations in the cut. By further increasing the angle such that it is too large one can damage the knife blade itself.

== Current Microtome Technology ==
The microtome market is undergoing a significant transformation due to rapid advancements in laboratory automation and precision engineering. Modern laboratories are adopting advanced microtome systems such as rotary microtomes, cryostat microtomes, and ultramicrotomes to enhance tissue sample preparation.

== See also ==
- Histology
- Microscope
