= Neuromere =

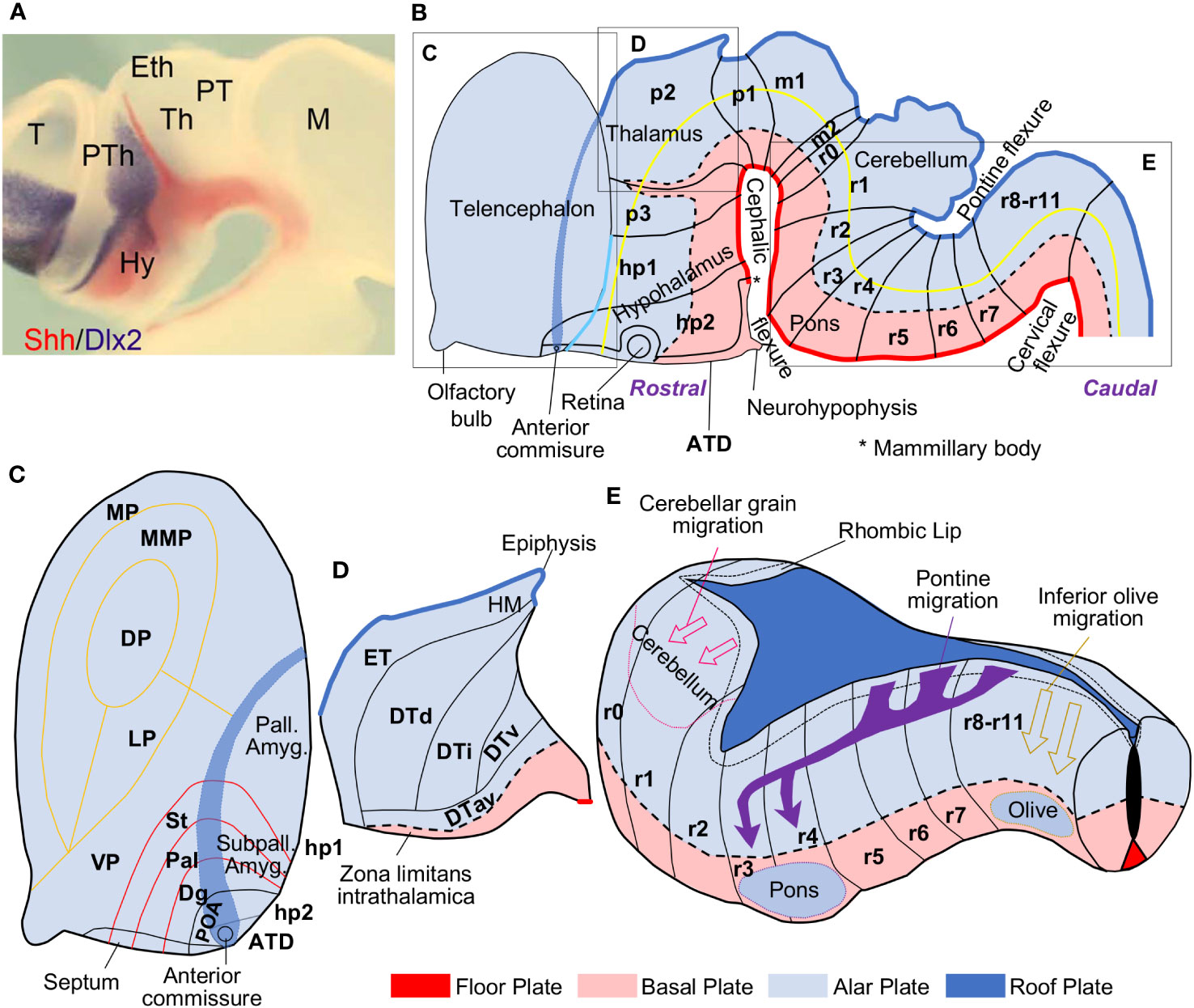
Chickembryo. Neuromeres: r11-r0, m2-m1, p1-p3, hp1, hp2. (hp1, hp2: hypothalamus prosomeren

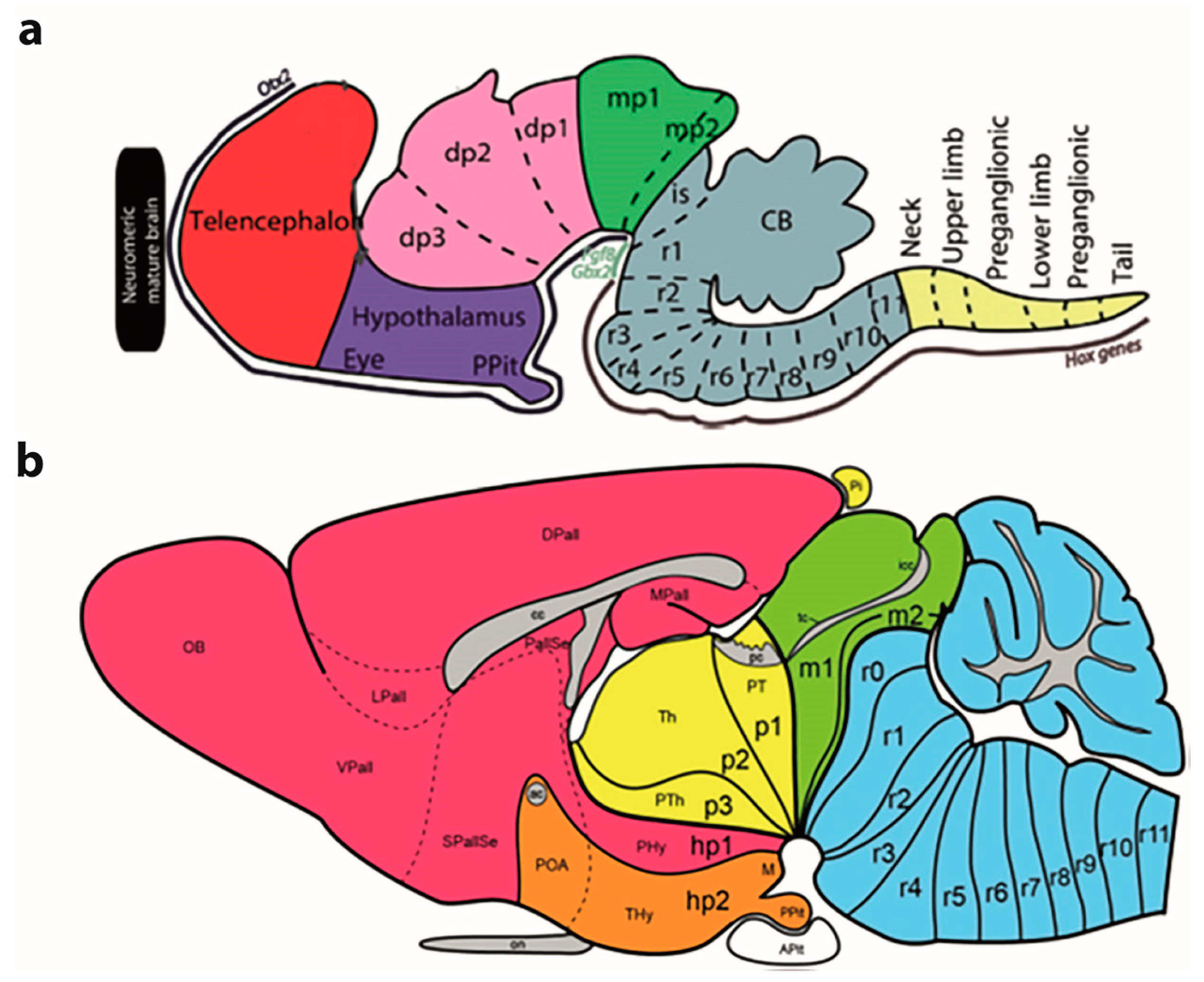
Schemata illustrating embryonic (a) and adult (b) location and abbreviations for neuromeres within the prosomeric model.

Diagram of early embryonic brain formation

Neuromeres are distinct groups of neural crest cells, forming segments in the neural tube of the early embryonic development of the brain. There are three classes of neuromeres in the central nervous system – prosomeres (for the prosencephalon), mesomeres (for the mesencephalon) and rhombomeres (for the rhombencephalon) that will develop the forebrain, midbrain, and hindbrain respectively.

Neuromeres can then be divided up so that each segment is carrying different and unique genetic traits, expressing different features in development.

Neuromeres were first discovered in the beginning of the 20th century. Although researchers have long since recognized the different signs of differentiation during embryonic development, it was widely thought that neuromeres held no relation to the structure of the nervous system. Swedish neuroembyrologists Bergquist and Kallen clarified the role of neuromeres by conducting several studies showing that neuromeres are important in the development of the nervous system. These experiments consisted of studying the brains of different vertebrates during their development period.

During embryonic development, neural crest cells from each neuromere prompt the development of the nerves and arteries, helping to support the development of craniofacial tissues. If gene expression goes wrong, it can have severe effects on the developing embryo, causing abnormalities like craniofacial clefts, also known as cleft palates. The anatomical boundaries of neuromeres are determined by the expression of unique genes known as Hox genes in a particular zone. The Hox genes contain the 183-bp homeobox, which encodes a particular portion of the Hox proteins called the homeodomain. The homeodomain can then bind to other portions of DNA to regulate gene expression. These genes determine the basic structure and orientation of an organism after the embryonic segments have formed. The neural crest cells that are found outside of a given neuromere will express the same proteins as the cells that are found inside the neural tube. The genes that are being expressed fall into two categories, extracellular signaling proteins and intracellular transcription factors. The genes are able to perform different tasks at different times depending on the environment that may or not be changing as well as when they are being activated and expressed.

The neural crest was first discovered by Wilhelm His in 1868 when he was studying the embryo of a chick. He first named it Zwischenstrang, which literally translated to mean “intermediate cord.” The name neural crest develops from the neural folds during embryonic development. This is where the neural plate folds in on itself, forming the neural crest. Neural crest cells will eventually become portions of the peripheral nervous system. During development, the neural tube is considered as the precursor to the spinal cord and the rest of the central nervous system.

The forebrain forms the six prosomeres, p1 to p6, which are then divided into two more categories, dorsal and ventral. The telencephalon forms from the dorsal parts of p6 and p5, where p6 becomes the olfactory system and p5 will coincide with the visual system. Mesomeres, m1 and m2, become the midbrain, which contains the superior and inferior colliculi. The 12 rhombomeres, which are numbered from r0 to r11, construct the hindbrain. The myelencephalon is made from rhombomeres r2 to r11, which also form the medulla. These rhombomeres are also associated with the neural crest that supplies the pharyngeal arches, a set of visible tissues that are in line with the developing brain and give rise to the head and neck.

== Spinal cord anatomy ==
Spinal segments are the part of the spinal cord, from which ventral and dorsal roots exit to form a specific pair of spinal nerves. The spinal cord is not segmented itself, it is only made into segments by the spinal nerves as they leave. 31 deferent segments exists in a human spinal cord:

=== 8 cervical segments ===
Cervical nerves exit above C1 segment and below C1-C7.
Note that this creates 8 nerves and segments corresponding to only 7 cervical vertebra.

=== 12 thoracic segments ===
Nerves exit below T1-T12.

=== 5 lumbar segments ===
Nerves exit below L1-L5.

=== 5 sacral segments ===
Nerves exit below S1-S5.

=== 1 coccygeal segment ===
Originally, during development there are two segments S1 and S2 which fuse.
The nerves in this case exit at the coccyx.

=== In more detail ===
The spinal cord is the main pathway for information connecting the brain and peripheral nervous system. The length of the spinal cord is much shorter than the length of the bony spinal column. The human spinal cord extends from the foramen magnum and continues through to the conus medullaris near the second lumbar vertebra, terminating in a fibrous extension known as the filum terminale.

It is about 45 cm (18 in) long in men and around 43 cm (17 in) in women, ovoid-shaped, and is enlarged in the cervical and lumbar regions. The cervical enlargement, located from C3 to T2 spinal segments, is where sensory input comes from and motor output goes to the arms. The lumbar enlargement, located between L1 and S3 spinal segments, handles sensory input and motor output coming from and going to the legs.

The spinal cord is protected by three layers of tissue, called spinal meninges, that surround the canal. The dura mater is the outermost layer, and it forms a tough protective coating. Between the dura mater and the surrounding bone of the vertebrae is a space called the epidural space. The epidural space is filled with adipose tissue, and it contains a network of blood vessels. The arachnoid mater is the middle protective layer. Its name comes from the fact that the tissue has a spiderweb-like appearance. The space between the arachnoid and the underlying pia mater is called the subarachnoid space. The subarachnoid space contains cerebrospinal fluid (CSF). The medical procedure known as a lumbar puncture (or "spinal tap") involves use of a needle to withdraw cerebrospinal fluid from the subarachnoid space, usually from the lumbar region of the spine. The pia mater is the innermost protective layer. It is very delicate and it is tightly associated with the surface of the spinal cord. The cord is stabilized within the dura mater by the connecting denticulate ligaments, which extend from the enveloping pia mater laterally between the dorsal and ventral roots. The dural sac ends at the vertebral level of the second sacral vertebra.

In cross-section, the peripheral region of the cord contains neuronal white matter tracts containing sensory and motor neurons. Internal to this peripheral region is the gray, butterfly-shaped central region made up of nerve cell bodies. This central region surrounds the central canal, which is an anatomic extension of the spaces in the brain known as the ventricles and, like the ventricles, contains cerebrospinal fluid.

The spinal cord has a shape that is compressed dorso-ventrally, giving it an elliptical shape. The cord has grooves in the dorsal and ventral sides. The posterior median sulcus is the groove in the dorsal side, and the anterior median fissure is the groove in the ventral side.

In the upper part of the vertebral column, spinal nerves exit directly from the spinal cord, whereas in the lower part of the vertebral column nerves pass further down the column before exiting. The terminal portion of the spinal cord is called the conus medullaris. The pia mater continues as an extension called the filum terminale, which anchors the spinal cord to the coccyx. The cauda equina (“horse’s tail”) is the name for the collection of nerves in the vertebral column that continue to travel through the vertebral column below the conus medullaris. The cauda equina forms as a result of the fact that the spinal cord stops growing in length at about age four, even though the vertebral column continues to lengthen until adulthood. This results in the fact that sacral spinal nerves actually originate in the upper lumbar region. The spinal cord can be anatomically divided into 31 spinal segments based on the origins of the spinal nerves.

Each segment of the spinal cord is associated with a pair of ganglia, called dorsal root ganglia, which are situated just outside the spinal cord. These ganglia contain cell bodies of sensory neurons. Axons of these sensory neurons travel into the spinal cord via the dorsal roots.

Ventral roots consist of axons from motor neurons, which bring information to the periphery from cell bodies within the CNS. Dorsal roots and ventral roots come together and exit the intervertebral foramina as they become spinal nerves.

The gray matter, in the center of the cord, is shaped like a butterfly and consists of cell bodies of interneurons and motor neurons. It also consists of neuroglia cells and unmyelinated axons. Projections of the gray matter (the “wings”) are called horns. Together, the gray horns and the gray commissure form the “gray H.”

The white matter is located outside of the gray matter and consists almost totally of myelinated motor and sensory axons. “Columns” of white matter carry information either up or down the spinal cord.

Within the CNS, nerve cell bodies are generally organized into functional clusters, called nuclei. Axons within the CNS are grouped into tracts.

There are 33 spinal cord nerve segments in a human spinal cord:

8 cervical segments forming 8 pairs of cervical nerves (C1 spinal nerves exit spinal column between occiput and C1 vertebra; C2 nerves exit between posterior arch of C1 vertebra and lamina of C2 vertebra; C3-C8 spinal nerves through IVF above corresponding cervica vertebra, with the exception of C8 pair which exit via IVF between C7 and T1 vertebra)

12 thoracic segments forming 12 pairs of thoracic nerves (exit spinal column through IVF below corresponding vertebra T1-T12)

5 lumbar segments forming 5 pairs of lumbar nerves (exit spinal column through IVF, below corresponding vertebra L1-L5)

5 sacral segments forming 5 pairs of sacral nerves (exit spinal column through IVF, below corresponding vertebra S1-S5)

3 coccygeal segments joined up becoming a single segment forming 1 pair of coccygeal nerves (exit spinal column through the sacral hiatus).

In the fetus, vertebral segments correspond with spinal cord segments. However, because the vertebral column grows longer than the spinal cord, spinal cord segments do not correspond to vertebral segments in the adult, particularly in the lower spinal cord. For example, lumbar and sacral spinal cord segments are found between vertebral levels T9 and L2, and the spinal cord ends around the L1/L2 vertebral level, forming a structure known as the conus medullaris.

Although the spinal cord cell bodies end around the L1/L2 vertebral level, the spinal nerves for each segment exit at the level of the corresponding vertebra. For the nerves of the lower spinal cord, this means that they exit the vertebral column much lower (more caudally) than their roots. As these nerves travel from their respective roots to their point of exit from the vertebral column, the nerves of the lower spinal segments form a bundle called the cauda equina.

There are two regions where the spinal cord enlarges: Cervical enlargement - corresponds roughly to the brachial plexus nerves, which innervate the upper limb. It includes spinal cord segments from about C4 to T1. The vertebral levels of the enlargement are roughly the same (C4 to T1). Lumbosacral enlargement - corresponds to the lumbosacral plexus nerves, which innervate the lower limb. It comprises the spinal cord segments from L2 to S3 and is found about the vertebral levels of T9 to T12.

== Embryology ==
The spinal cord develops from part of the neural tube during development. As the neural tube begins to develop, the notochord begins to secrete a factor known as Sonic hedgehog or SHH. As a result, the floor plate then also begins to secrete SHH, and this will induce the basal plate to develop motor neurons.

Meanwhile, the overlying ectoderm secretes bone morphogenetic protein (BMP). This induces the roof plate to begin to secrete BMP, which will induce the alar plate to develop sensory neurons. The alar plate and the basal plate are separated by the sulcus limitans.

Additionally, the floor plate also secretes netrins. The netrins act as chemoattractants to decussation of pain and temperature sensory neurons in the alar plate across the anterior white commissure, where they then ascend towards the thalamus.

The elimination of neuronal cells by programmed cell death (PCD) is necessary for the correct assembly of the nervous system.
