= Rhombic lip =

Posterior section of the developing metencephalon

The rhombic lip is a posterior section of the developing metencephalon which can be recognized transiently within the vertebrate embryo. It extends posteriorly from the roof of the fourth ventricle to dorsal neuroepithelial cells. The rhombic lip can be divided into eight structural units based on rhombomeres 1-8 (r1-r8), which can be recognized at early stages of hindbrain development. Producing granule cells and five brainstem nuclei, the rhombic lip plays an important role in developing a complex cerebellar neural system.

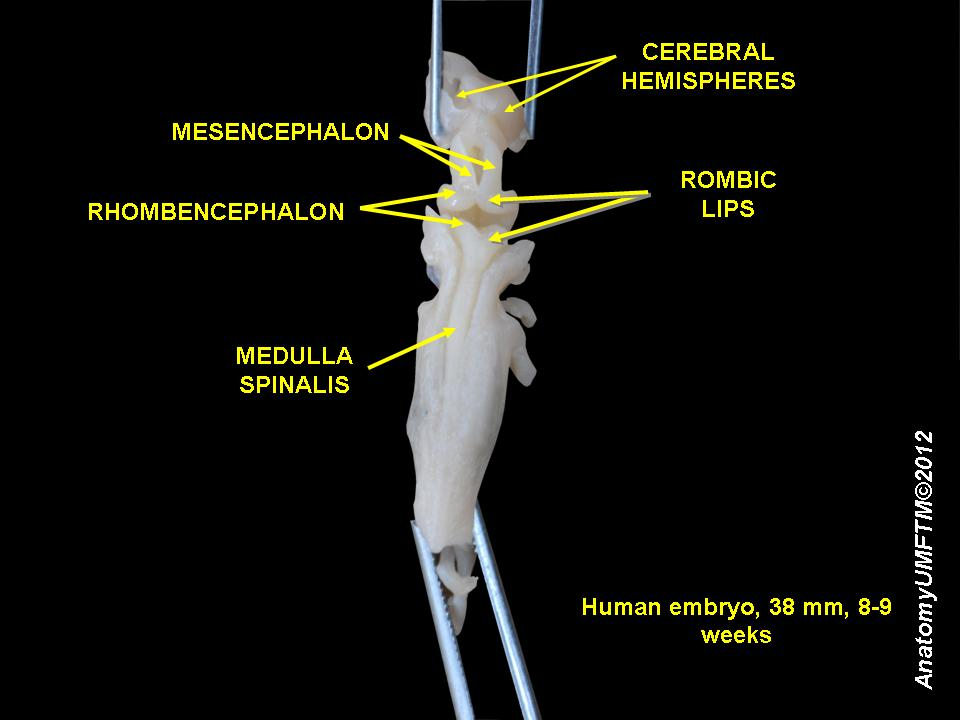
Rhombic lips

== History ==
Through studies of human embryos performed in the late 1890s, Swiss anatomist Wilhelm His identified a portion of hindbrain neuroepithelium that was distinct from the rest of the hindbrain neuroepithelium in its morphology, sustained chromosomal division into late stages of embryogenesis, and deployment of streams of neurons through the hindbrain periphery. His named this zone "rautenlippe," or rhombic lip, because it seemed to emanate from the rhomboid-shaped opening of the fourth ventricle, much like the shape of a mouth. His proposed that the rhombic lip held the precerebellar precursors that would migrate ventrally to populate the pontine and olivary nuclei, but the methodologies available at the time limited the amount of evidence he could gather. The first real evidence that precerebellar neurons had a dorsal origin was obtained in the 1990s through the use of chick-quail chimeras, a technique in which portions of quail hindbrain neuroepithelium are grafted into chick embryos in ovo. Tracking the ventral migration of the quail daughter cells confirmed His' theory.

== Development ==
Metencephalon
- Diagram depicting the main subdivisions of the embryonic vertebrate brain. These regions will later differentiate into forebrain, midbrain and hindbrain structures.

- Pons and cerebellum.

Identifiers
- NeuroLex ID: birnlex_965

=== Origin of cerebellar territory ===
The cerebellum, or "little brain," is a portion of the brain attached to the brainstem at the pons. Among other functions, it is important for balance, coordinating movement, and maintaining muscle tone. The outer layer of the cerebellum, the cortex, is made up of three layers containing two classes of neurons. One of these classes has been identified as granule cells, which are produced by the rhombic lip.

Genes FGF8 and EN1 play an important role in patterning the midbrain and hindbrain regions. In particular, studies have shown that different dosages of FGF8 appear to specify the tectum or cerebellum: regions exposed to strong dosages of FGF8 acquire cerebellar characteristics while regions exposed to weak dosages become the tectum.

=== Cellular contribution of the rhombic lip ===
Neural specification in the cerebellum begins as a symmetric bulge in the fourth ventricle. Around embryonic days nine to eleven, cells arise from two areas: the rhombic lip and the ventricular zone. The rhombic lip produces glutamatergic granule neurons (which evolve from r1) and the five brainstem nuclei (thought to evolve from r6-r8). One brainstem nucleus, the inferior olivary nucleus, projects climbing fibers to innervate Purkinje cells. The other four nuclei (the external cuneate nucleus, the lateral reticular nucleus, the pontine nucleus, and the thalamic reticular nucleus) project mossy fibers to innervate granule neurons. Meanwhile, cells in the ventricular zone evolve into GABAergic Purkinje cells (another type of cerebellar neuron) and deep cerebellar nuclei.

=== Rhombic lip development ===
Located between the fourth ventricle and the roofplate, the rhombic lip extends from r1-r8 and can be divided into upper, or cerebellar, and lower, or hindbrain, portions as the brainstem bends during later development. Expression of Math1, a transcription factor with a basic helix-loop-helix structure, governs the germinal epithelium of the rhombic lip and is expressed in midbrain and hindbrain regions as early as embryonic day 9.5 (E9.5). Math 1-null mice have been shown to lack several rhombic lip derivatives, including the granule neurons of the cerebellum and the pontine nucleus of the precerebellar system. The rhombic lip is organized according to a temporal fate map in which Math1-expressing precursors that first emigrate from the germinative layer (prior to E12.5) become deep nuclear neurons, while those exiting later (E13) become granule cells. Chick-quail chimera experiments have shown that r1 is the most likely source of granule cell precursors. Inside the rhombic lip, granule cell precursors divide and develop a unipolar morphology, with a single process that projects toward their destination.

As development continues, the granule precursor cells that originated in the RL generate the external granule layer (EGL). This movement takes place between E15 and P15 (Embryonic stage 15 and Postnatal stage 15). The EGL is a secondary germinative epithelium that encompasses the entire cerebellum. This period is an important developmental stage of the cerebellum. The expansion of the EGL precursor cells creates a large population of neurons that outnumber Purkinje cells 250:1 in the adult cerebellar cortex. The granule neurons in EGL express genes that play a specific and crucial role in cell proliferation. These genes are called Math1, RU49/Zipro1 and Zic1. As previously mentioned, Math1 is expressed early in the development of the RL. Knock-out experiments involving RU49/Zipro1 lead to very little change in brain structure, but over-expression of these genes leads to a dramatic increase in the amount of granule cells and in the proliferation of the outer EGL. This result suggests that the RU49/Zipro1 gene plays a sufficient role in cell proliferation.

Around P15, granule cell proliferation requires interaction with Purkinje cells, a type of cerebellar neuron characterized by a large and branching dendritic arbor. These cells release sonic hedgehog (Shh); which is a protein that controls the further proliferation of granule cell precursors. This means that around stage P15 the proliferation of granule cell precursors is controlled by genes that it transcribes (RU49/Zipro1) as well as the products of connecting cells (Shh).

Once the EGL is fully formed, granule cell precursors migrate inward, forming a layer called the inner granule layer. Just prior to migration, the cells go through a series of electrophysiological changes. It is believed that NMDA receptors are activated to prepare the cell for further migration. The activation of these NMDA receptors causes the depolarization of the cells. In order to balance out this depolarization, the channel GIRK2 is activated. It is involved in hyperpolarizing the cell after the NMDA receptors depolarize the cell. While these changes are happening, the cells are also guided to this new layer by radial glial cells. Once they are in the IGL they stop dividing and no longer express the Math1 gene.

The final stage of granule cell maturation occurs in the IGL. The granule cells express a different set of mature receptors at this stage including, GC5 and GABA receptors. New cells also make contact with the granule cells. Mossy fibers, which are mostly found in the precerebellar nuclei, make contact with granule cells in the IGL. Granule neurons also extend out to make contacts with Golgi cells.
