= Rhombomere =

Transient structure in animal development

In the vertebrate embryo, a rhombomere is a transiently divided segment of the developing neural tube, within the hindbrain region (a neuromere) in the area that will eventually become the rhombencephalon. The rhombomeres appear as a series of slightly constricted swellings in the neural tube, caudal to the cephalic flexure. In human embryonic development, the rhombomeres are present by day 29.

== Function ==
In the early developmental stages of the neural tube, segmentation of the neuroepithelium occurs. This segmentation turns into a series of neuromeres. Each segment is called a rhombomere. Every rhombomere develops its own set of ganglia and nerves. Later on in development, rhombomeres form the rhombocephalon, which forms the hindbrain in vertebrates. Each rhombomere expresses its own unique set of genes, which has been shown to influence postnatal rhythmic behaviors, such as respiration, mastication, and walking. In mice, it was shown that the patterning of the neural tube into rhombomeric segments may regulate spatial and temporal appearance of the central pattern generator. Rhombomeres are considered self-governing developmental units, with certain aspects of the rhombomere phenotype being determined at the time of formation. Each rhombomere expresses a unique combination of transcription factors, and so each rhombomeric domain has its own distinct molecular cues that could, theoretically, establish rhombomere-specific patterns of neuronal differentiation. Some of these neuronal populations have been identified in some species. Many of the mature hindbrain nuclei can occupy either one or several rhombomere-derived regions. Vestibular nuclei have been shown to span all the rhombomeres, some correlating with the boundaries of the rhombomeres. Using phosphorylated retrograde labeling, it has been shown that vestibulospinal groups correspond mostly to single rhombomeres rather than over several rhombomeric regions. It has also been shown that the vestibule-ocular groups can either relate to single or multiple rhombomeres, as long as the rhombomeres are closely related. The conclusion drawn was that segmentation of the hindbrain contributes to the way axons project within the vestibular complex. Finally, vestibulospinal neurons have been shown to differentiate in three neighboring rhombomeres, specifically r4, r5, and r6. While vestibule-ocular neurons differentiate across seven, the least differentiated in f4. The method of this differentiate is still unknown, with many types of proteins involved in both the migration, expression of proteins, and for neuron growth and apoptosis. The types of receptors, as well, can vary their activity to be cell-specific.

Rhombomeres determine the pattern of the following maturation of the rhombencephalon into its final parts. The final parts are defined as the pons, cerebellum and medulla.

Cells that form the boundaries of the rhombomere bulges proliferate much faster than those in the middle. It is very difficult for cells to cross from one rhombomere to another, so cells tend to stay within one rhombomere. Each rhombomere eventually gives rise to one or more vestibular neuron types. However, it is not necessarily dependent on segmentation. The motor nerves form depending on rhombomeric patterns, but each nerve can come from either one rhombomere or a pair of rhombomeres that are neighbors. Furthermore, the correct development of the various pharyngeal arches is believed to depend on interactions with specific rhombomeres. With these mechanisms, neural crest cells, for instance, from each rhombomere give rise to different ganglia, or clusters of neurons. Many of these rhombomeres have been mapped to an extent in species other than human. For example, r2 has been shown to give rise to the trigeminal ganglion, while r4 has been shown to give rise to the geniculate ganglion as well as spiral and Scarpa's ganglia. r5 and r6 gives rise to the abducens nerve, and the lower part of r6 and the upper part of r7 gives rise to the petrosal ganglion. Finally, the border of r7 that is not in contact with r6 gives rise to the jugular/nodose ganglia. These mappings, however, cannot be applied cross species.

Studies have shown that the number of neurons in the hindbrain increase as a species evolves. For example, a mouse has more neurons than a slug, but a chimp has more neurons than a mouse. One can assume that part of this comes from having to adapt to an increase in the size of the species. Also, in some species, the rhombomeres are obviously segmented and stay this way for an extended period of time. In other species, the segmentation eventually disappears. For example, rhombomeres are detectable by light microscopy in Swiss/Webster strain of mice for up to embryonic day (E)10.5, but they disappear at E11.5. Many rhombomeres, if compared across species, do not form into the same things. For example, r2 and r3 have been mapped to the trigeminal motoneurons in many species. However, not all species have this correlation.

Each rhombomere has its own set of receptors, and the same receptors can cause different actions. For example, one study showed that there are proteins called Gli1, Gli2, and Gli3 that affect ventral hindbrain development, and are also required for motoneuron development and correct neural patterning in the hindbrain. However, how important are they and what their specific roles are was unclear. By mutating the proteins Gli2 and Gli3, which were especially studied, it was found that Gli2 and Gli3 contain both activation and repression domains, while Gli1 only had activation domains, which were entirely transcriptional. Gli2 was also found to be a stronger activator while Gli3 was a strong repressor. Gli2 and Gli3 had overlapping functions that concerned the patterning of the ventral spinal cord which was important for correct organization and formation of the motoneurons. This was shown when mutation of the Gli3 protein showed only a slight decrease in expression of Olig2, while when the Gli2 protein was mutated, the expression of Olig2 was not detected. Olig2 is normally expressed in the ventral area of the neural tube. Mutations in the Gli2 protein causes more severe damage in the ventral patterning of the hindbrain than that of the spinal cord. This shows that Gli2 performs different functions in the hindbrain that Gli3 is unable to substitute. Gli2 and Gli3 in a developing hindbrain also have distinct functions in the Shh (sonic hedgehog) signal transduction. This is caused by differential modulation of gene expression that is specific to each rhombomere. Finally, studies have shown that in rhombomere 4, the ventral patterning is less affected by the mutation of Gli2. This shows that this particular rhombomere has different requirements for Gli proteins.

The Hox gene also has been shown to play a part in the formation of the cranial motor nerves. The fate of a rhombomere has been shown to be affected by differential expression of the Hox gene. With mutations in the Hox gene, the cranial motor nerves formed in different locations than normal or simply did not form altogether. One possibility for this was that the Hox gene was somehow involved in regionalization within the neural tube, and that expression of this particular gene correlated with the amount of migration that occurred. However, no correlation could be found. Many studies showed small amounts of correlation, but there were equal amounts showing a complete lack of correlation. The amount of correlation that occurred was not enough to draw a concrete conclusion from. This, however, could have happened because studies have only drawn data points from a limited window of time. Another possibility for this lack of correlation is that most studies were based on in situ hybridization, which only maps the location of transcripts rather than proteins. A third possibility is that studies focused on rhombomeres as landmarks, and therefore correlated expression domains to these. While studies were unable to show a relationship between closely related neurons from the rhombomeres and Hox gene expression, the Hox gene is still an important factor when it comes to specification of the neuronal phenotype. The Hox gene was expressed rostrocaudally in the same sequence that was physically within the chromosome and its transcription was regulated by retinoic acid. The Hox gene has been identified in all vertebrates, and the number of Hox genes expressed increases as the vertebrate species diverge farther away from the invertebrate species. Certain neuron groups relate to Hox gene expression. At the r4 level, Hoxb1 is suspected to bestow rhombomere 4 cell identity.

Rhombomeres have also been shown to be able to affect the position that reticulospinal and branchiomotor neurons grow in. Each rhombomere can cause a repeated pattern of rhombomere-specific neurons, including reticulospinal neurons, many of which share properties such as mediolateral location. Reticulospinal neurons also occupy different areas in rhombomeres in different species. It was found in one study that reticular neurons in the lamprey hindbrain, which included isthmic, bulbar, and Mauthner cells, developed in conserved rhombomere-specific positions, similar to those in the zebrafish. In different species, however, reticulospinal neurons occupy different areas in rhombomeres. The trigeminal and facial motor nuclei were also shown to not correlate well with the rhombomere boundaries in the lamprey.

Several studies have shown that the fibroblast growth factor (FGF) is secreted from the midbrain-rhombomere 1 boundary. These proteins instruct cell behavior in the surrounding neuroectoderm. However, the mechanism behind the integration of the signal and the actions that follow remains unclear. Studies have shown that the FGF receptors, or FGFRs act partially redundantly to support cell survival in the dorsal ectoderm, promote r1 tissue identity, and regulate the production of ventral neuronal populations, including the midbrain dopaminergic neurons. In mice, while mutations of the fgfr2 and fgfr3 did not interfere with the development of the midbrain and r1, mutation of fgfr1 caused midbrain and r1 defects.

Studies have shown that the earliest serotonergic neurons were started in the anterior rhombomeres. The most dorsal group of neurons originated from rhombomere 1, and the posterior raphe—which forms from the rhombomeres—is believed to derive from the posterior rhombomeres at a slightly later stage of embryonic development.

Rhombomeres also lead to the creation of vestibular projection neurons, which are probably produced relatively early in the developmental stages of the brain stem.

In the rhombomeres, members of the T-box transcription factor family, have been linked to the proper development of migrating cells. While the hindbrain is developing, trigeminal cell bodies have been shown to migrate dorsolaterally within rhombomeres 2 and 3, while facial cells move dorsolaterally into r5 near the pial surface. Neurons that form the facial nucleus are produced in r4, but move along the anteroposterior axis of the hindbrain into r6, after which they move dorsolaterally. The vestibuloacoustic neurons are also produced in r4. However, they have a unique migration pattern, where their cell bodies cross the midline to the contralateral side. From this one can conclude that multiple subclasses of motor neurons are produced in specific locations in the developing hindbrain. All of them are related by the expression of Tbx20. Motor neurons produced in the hindbrain have Tbx20 selectively expressed. In Tbx20 mutations, the patterning of the regions of the rhombomeres and motor neurons were normal when they were conditional mutations and the neurons were post-mitotic. Tbx20 mutants pre-mitotic showed many cell migration deficiencies, including abnormal dorsolateral migration of the trigeminal cells, arrested tangential migration of the facial neurons, and a lack of transmedian migration of vestibuloacoustic cells. However, hindbrain motor neurons lacking Tbx20 retained the ability to extend neurites into the periphery. The complete elimination of Tbx20 does not cause trigeminal and facial neurons to switch to hypoglossal neurons. Facial neurons have been shown to migrate tangentially from r4 to r6, while trigeminal neurons that are produced in r2 migrate dorsolaterally non-radially. Vestibuloacoustic cells migrate along the midline at r4 contralaterally in the hindbrain. Tbx20 seems to have context-dependent transcriptional activity. This means that it is able to control different cell migration programs specific to different types of cells. It must be able to regulate these patterns by different means.

While many studies have been done on rhombomeres where rhombomeres are grafted cross species, imprecision can occur. One possible source is damage to the rhombomere during the removal, transportation, or grafting process. Another possible source is the mixture of the cells from different species after the rhombomeres have been grafted on, which could lead to the contamination of one rhombomeric region with another, most likely from the neighboring rhombomeres.

== See also ==
- Rhombic lip
