= Angle of His =

Anatomical structure

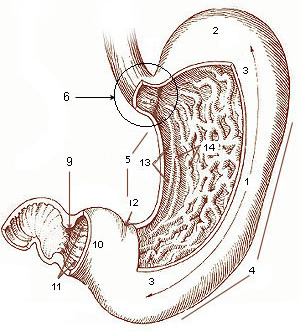
- The angle of His is formed between the esophagus (the tube arriving at the top of the image) and the cardia (position 6)

The angle of His, also known as the esophagogastric angle, is the acute angle created between the cardia at the entrance to the stomach, and the esophagus. It helps to prevent reflux of stomach acid into the esophagus. It is commonly undeveloped in infants, making acid reflux fairly common.

== Structure ==
The angle of His is the acute angle between the stomach and the esophagus. It is created by the collar sling fibres and the circular muscles around this gastroesophageal junction.

=== Variation ===
The angle of His is normally undeveloped in infants, with the esophagus making a vertical junction with the stomach. As a result, reflux of stomach contents is common.

== Function ==
The angle of His forms an anatomical sphincter. This prevents the reflux of stomach acid, digestive enzymes, and duodenal bile from entering the esophagus. This is important in preventing gastroesophageal reflux disease and inflammation of the esophagus.

== History ==
The angle of His is also known as the esophagogastric angle. It was named after the Swiss anatomist Wilhelm His Sr. by the Scottish anatomist Daniel John Cunningham in 1906.
