= Heinrich Werner (physician) =

German physician (1874–1946)

Heinrich Werner (14 May 1874 – 1946) was a German physician born in Mühlhausen, Saxony.

He studied medicine at the Kaiser Wilhelm Academy in Berlin, and subsequently served as a military physician in various capacities in the German colonies of German East Africa, German Southwest Africa (1904–1906) and Kamerun (1914). Within this time period he also worked as a medical clinician in Hamburg (1906-1913). During World War I he was a corps- and army hygienist in Belgium, Russia and Romania. After the war, he retired with the title of Generaloberst, practicing medicine in Berlin as a specialist of infectious diseases.

Werner is remembered for his description of trench fever during an outbreak of the disease in World War I. The disorder is sometimes referred to as "Werner–His disease", named in conjunction with Swiss anatomist Wilhelm His, Jr., who also described the malady. The disease is caused by the parasite Rickettsia quintana, and transmitted to humans by the body louse Pediculus humanus corporis.

During his career, Werner published a number of articles on tropical and parasitic diseases.

== Bibliography ==
- Enteramoeba coli. Handbuch der pathogenen Protozooen, volume 1; Leipzig, 1912.
- "Über eine besondere Erkrankung, die er als Fünftagefiber bezeichnet." Berliner klinische Wochenschrift, 1916, 53: 204. (Concerning trench fever)
- Febris quintana. Berlin and Vienna, 1920.
- "Malaria". In Friedrich Kraus (1858–1936) and Theodor Brugsch (1878–1963): Spezielle Pathologie und Therapie. Volume 2, 3, Berlin, 1923 (19 volumes, Berlin and Vienna, Urban & Schwarzenberg, 1919–1929).
- Fünftagefieber; Handbuch der pathogenen Mikroorganismen, 3rd edition, volume 8,2; Jena, Berlin, and Vienna, 1930.
- Ein Tropenarzt sah Afrika. Nachgelassene papiere. Mit einem Vorwort von E. G. Nauck. Strasbourg/Kehl, ca 1950. 93 pages.
