= Wilhelm His Jr. =

Swiss cardiologist and anatomist (1863–1934)

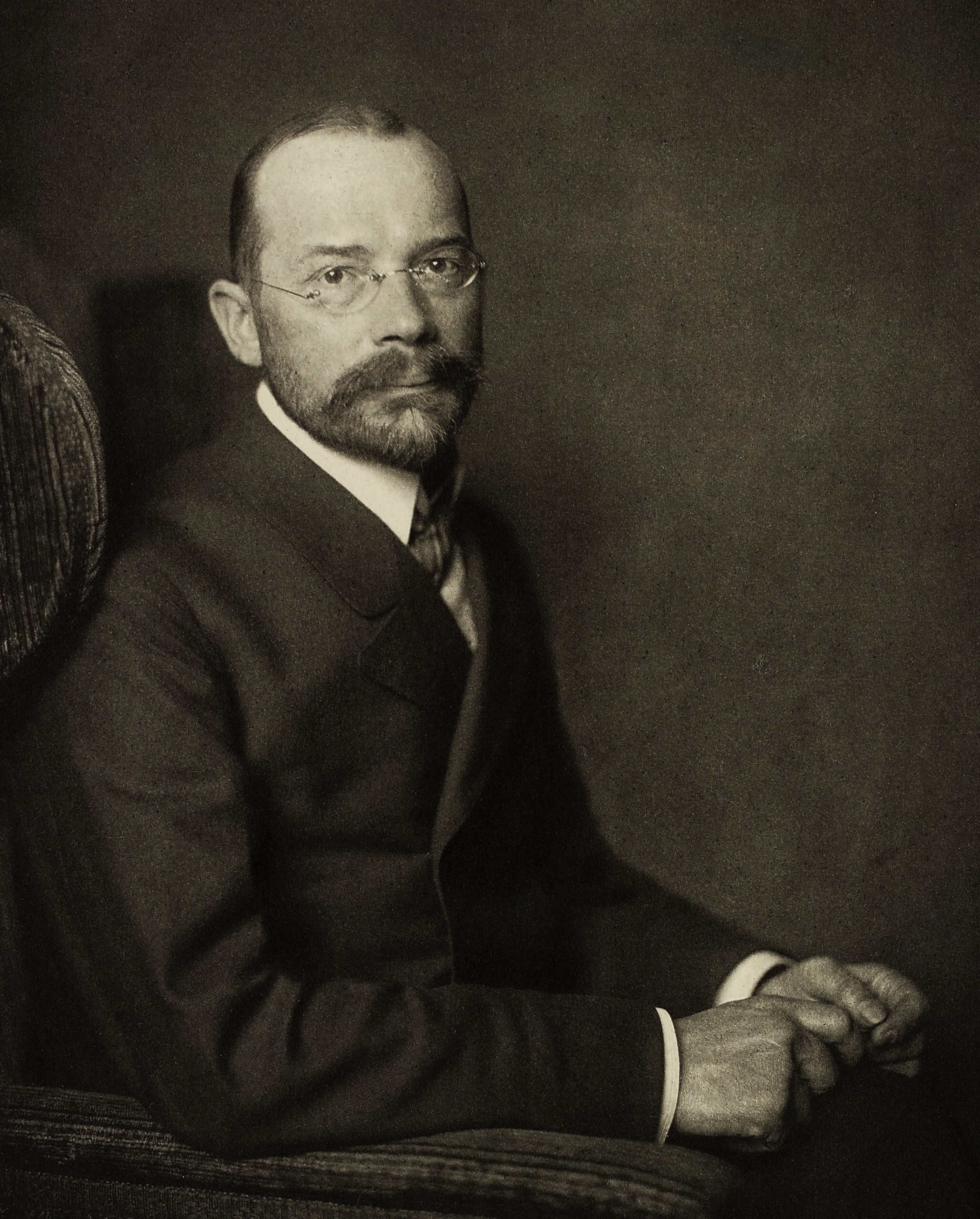
- Born: 29 December 1863; Basel, Switzerland
- Died: 10 November 1934 (aged 70); Brombach near Lörrach, Germany
- Known for: Bundle of His

Wilhelm His Jr. (29 December 1863 – 10 November 1934) was a Swiss cardiologist and anatomist, son of Wilhelm His Sr.

In 1893, His discovered the bundle of His, the collection of specialized cardiac muscle cells in the heart that transmits electrical impulses and helps synchronize contraction of the cardiac muscles. Later in life, as a professor of medicine at the University of Berlin, he was one of the first to recognize that "the heartbeat has its origin in the individual cells of heart muscle."

Werner–His disease (or trench fever) was also named after him.

Angle of His (or incisura cardiaca) was named after him by Daniel John Cunningham in 1906.

== Works ==
- Die Front der Ärzte . Velhagen & Klasing, Bielefeld [u.a.] 1931 Digital edition by the University and State Library Düsseldorf
