= Photodisruption =

Form of minimally invasive surgery used in ophthalmology

- Specialty: Ophthalmology

Photodisruption is a form of minimally invasive surgery used in ophthalmology, utilizing infrared Nd:YAG lasers to form plasma ("lightning bolt"), which then causes acoustic shock waves ("thunderclap") which then in turn affects tissue. The tissue ruptures as a result of the vapor bubble produced by the laser; the temperature required to produce this effect is between 100 and 305 °C.

Because the infrared laser is invisible to the surgeon's eye, typically a companion HeNe laser is used in conjunction. However, the eye lens acts as a prism, so the infrared light bends at a shallower angle than the red light, causing chromatic aberration. This means the area highlighted by the HeNe laser is not precisely the area being affected Nd:YAG laser, and therefore some surgical lasers have an added adjustment to compensate.

The first successful use of photodisruption was in 1972, on a case of trabecular meshwork. Photodisruption came to wide use in the early 1980s for the treatment of extracapsular cataract extraction. The technique is most commonly used for lithotripsy of urinary calculi and the treatment of posterior capsulotomy of the lens. When used in corneal surgery, picosecond and nanosecond disruptors are used on the lamellae of the corneal stroma, and the method may be preferable as it leaves the epithelium and Bowman's layer unharmed. This modifies the outer corneal curvature, which affects the refractive property of the eye.
