= Wilhelm His Sr. =

Swiss anatomist (1831–1904)

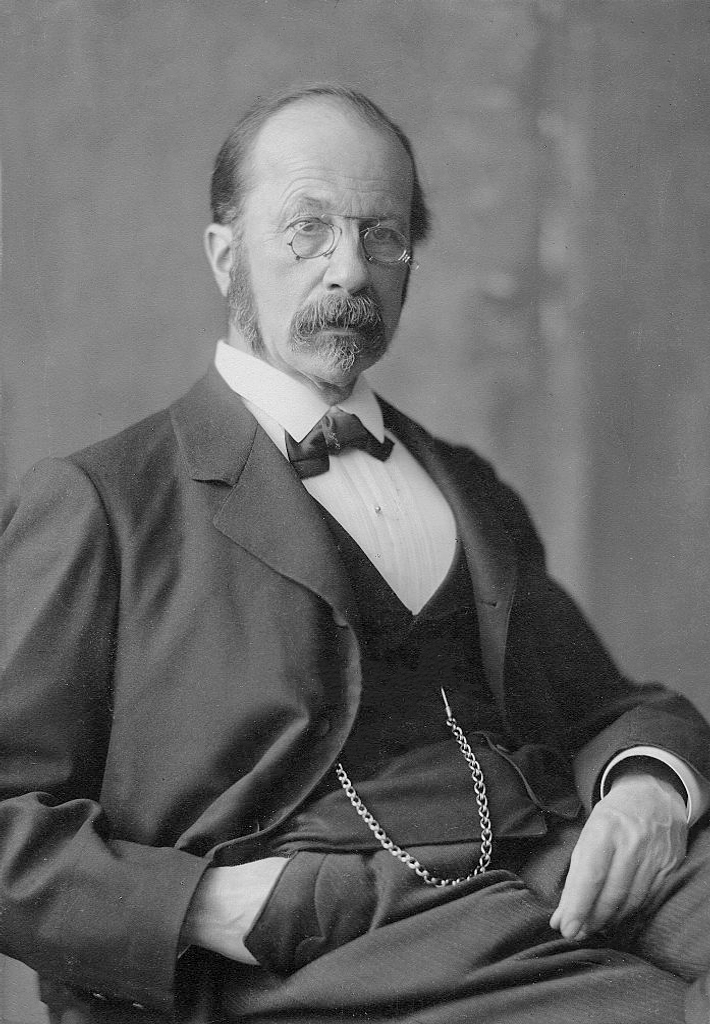
- c. 1900
- Born: 9 July 1831; Basel, Switzerland
- Died: 1 May 1904 (aged 72); Leipzig, Germany
- Known for: Microtome, contribution to neuron doctrine

Wilhelm His Sr. (9 July 1831 – 1 May 1904) was a Swiss anatomist and professor who invented the microtome. By treating animal tissue with acids and salts to harden it and then slicing it very thinly with the microtome, scientists were able to further study the organization and function of tissues and cells under a microscope.

== Career ==
His came from a patrician family and studied medicine in Basel, Berlin (under Johannes Peter Müller and Robert Remak), Würzburg (under Rudolf Virchow and Albert von Kölliker), Bern, Vienna and Paris. He received a doctorate in 1854, and in 1856 received the habilitation (higher doctorate) in Basel.

In 1855, he was the first to describe the tubercles in the human foetus which coalesce to form the outer ear; these are known as the "hillocks of His". In 1857, at the age of 26, he became professor of anatomy and physiology at the University of Basel. In 1872 he took up a call from University of Leipzig to become professor there. His introduced the word endothelium, distinguishing these internal membranes, which had formerly been grouped with epithelia, and developing an understanding of their relationship to the germ layers in development

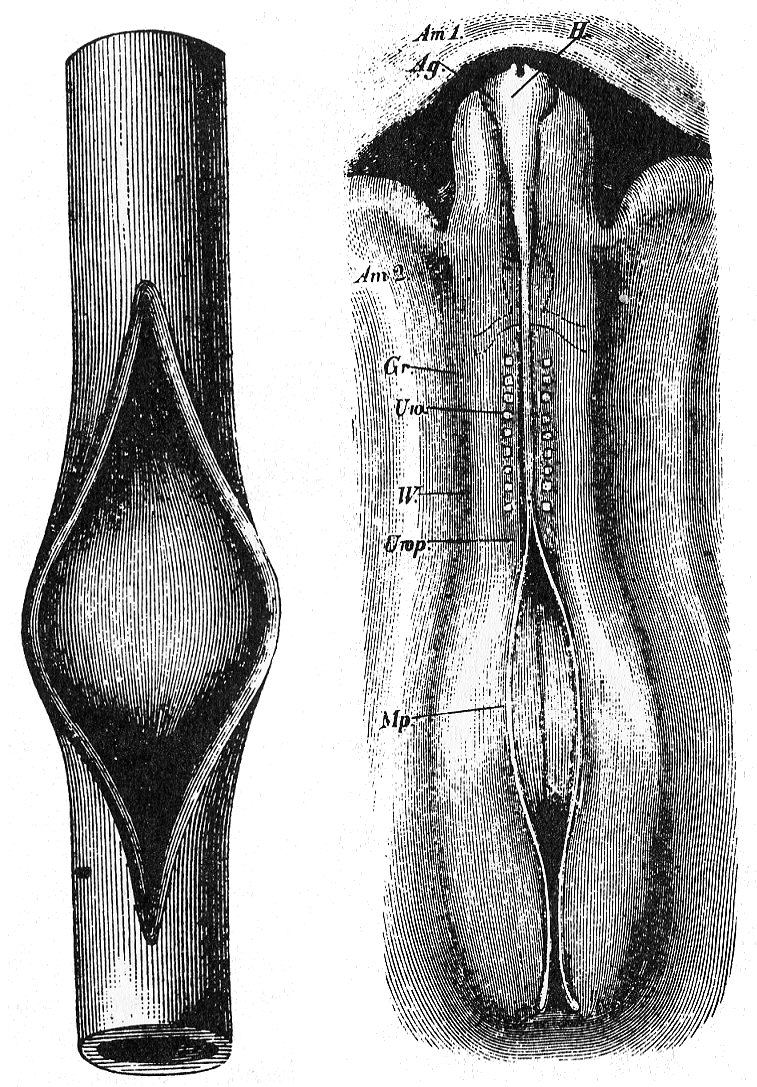
His's drawing comparing a chick embryo to a slit rubber tube, 1874. He argued that the shapes of structures are dictated mechanically when one part grows more than another, in opposition to Haeckel.

His specifically rejected all forms of soft inheritance (Lamarckism). The passage runs [original in German]: "Until it has been refuted, I stand by the statement that characters can not be inherited that were acquired during the lifetime of the individual". The passage comes from his 1874 work Unsere Körperform und das physiologische Problem ihrer Entstehung (The Form of Our Body and the Physiological Problem of Its Development; Leipzig: Vogel). The historical significance is that it was not until 1883 that August Weismann made a similar declaration.

His is also remembered for disputing the veracity of Ernst Haeckel's drawings of embryo, which had been used as justification for the development of recapitulation theory and for his identification of a germinative zone within the developing vertebrate metencephalon that he later termed the rhombic lip.

Between 1879 and 1886 he made groundbreaking studies of the development of the nervous system in a collection of 12 human embryos from 2 to 8.5 weeks development, for example observing the progressive outgrowth of nerves into the fingers.

His was elected a member of the Royal Swedish Academy of Sciences in 1892.

By 1895, Wilhem His, Professor of Anatomy at the University of Leipzig, had published a three-dimensional reconstruction of Johann Sebastian Bach's face from the skull based on his precise measurements of facial tissue depths of cadaver heads. To begin with, His collected tissue depth data by using a thin needle bearing a small rubber piece that would ride upward on the needle as it was pushed into the tissue of cadavers. The needle was placed at right angles to the bone and pressed into the tissue until its point touched the bone. The displacement of the rubber was measured and recorded for 15 specific locations on 24 male and four female suicide victims along with nine men who died of wasting illnesses.

Wilhelm His Sr. was the father of the physician and cardiologist Wilhelm His Jr.

In 1897, His was named an honorary member of the American Association for Anatomy.

== See also ==
- Wilhelm His Jr.
- Embryology
- Forensic facial reconstruction
